= Virtual actor =

(Re-)creation of a human being in image and voice

A virtual actor, also known as virtual human, virtual persona, digital actor, or digital clone is the creation or re-creation of a human being in image and voice using computer-generated imagery and sound, that is often indistinguishable from the real actor. A virtual actor created with the assistance of artificial intelligence is commonly referred to as an AI-generated actor. US legislation uses the term digital replicas for digital figures of real identifiable people.

While “virtual actor” and “AI-generated actor” were long terms used primarily in film history and art history, they are now increasingly used in a new context. In the United States the photorealistic appearance of AI-generated actors made by new-generation AI software have prompted US lawmakers to address the unauthorized creation and use of virtual characters that look like real, identifiable people. The NO FAKES Act of 2026 found bipartisan support in Congress and further federal regulation is widely expected to follow in 2027.

In general, virtual humans employed in movies are known as synthespians, virtual actors, cyberstars, or silicentric actors. There are several legal ramifications for the digital cloning of human actors, relating to copyright and personality rights.

== Historical development and CGI era (1980s–2010s) ==
The idea of a virtual actor was first portrayed in the 1981 film Looker, wherein models had their bodies scanned digitally to create 3D computer-generated images of the models, which were then animated for use in television commercials. Two 1992 books used this concept: Fools by Pat Cadigan, and Et Tu, Babe by Mark Leyner.

Early computer-generated animated faces include the 1985 film Tony de Peltrie and the music video for Mick Jagger's song "Hard Woman" (from She's the Boss). Computer-generated animation and image creation is often abbreviated as CGI, short for computer-generated imagery. The character of Max Headroom was often called an early virtual actor and digital TV star, though he was actually a human actor (Matt Frewer) wearing heavy prosthetic makeup and a plastic suit.

The first actual human beings to be digitally duplicated were Marilyn Monroe and Humphrey Bogart in a March 1987 film Rendez-vous in Montreal created by Nadia Magnenat Thalmann and Daniel Thalmann for the 100th anniversary of the Engineering Institute of Canada. The film was created by six people over a year, and had Monroe and Bogart meeting in a café in Montreal, Quebec, Canada. Using CGI, the characters were rendered in three dimensions, and were capable of speaking, showing emotion, and shaking hands.

In 1987, the Kleiser-Walczak Construction Company (now Synthespian Studios), founded by Jeff Kleiser and Diana Walczak coined the term "synthespian" and began its Synthespian ("synthetic thespian") Project, with the aim of creating "life-like figures based on the digital animation of clay models".

In 1988, Tin Toy was the first entirely computer-generated movie to win an Academy Award (Best Animated Short Film). In the same year, Mike the Talking Head, an animated head whose facial expression and head posture were controlled in real time by a puppeteer using a custom-built controller, was developed by Silicon Graphics, and performed live at SIGGRAPH. In 1989, The Abyss, directed by James Cameron included a computer-generated face placed onto a watery pseudopod.

In 1991, Terminator 2: Judgment Day, also directed by Cameron, confident in the abilities of computer-generated effects from his experience with The Abyss, included a mixture of synthetic actors with live animation, including computer models of Robert Patrick's face. The Abyss contained just one scene with photo-realistic computer graphics. Terminator 2: Judgment Day contained over forty shots throughout the film.

In 1997, Industrial Light & Magic worked on creating a virtual actor that was a composite of the bodily parts of several real actors.

In 2000, Microsoft Research published an article by Gordon Bell and Jim Gray, titled "Digital immortality." The authors worked on the system called MyLifeBits to create a "digital clone" of a person from digital data.

By 2002, Arnold Schwarzenegger, Jim Carrey, Kate Mulgrew, Michelle Pfeiffer, Denzel Washington, Gillian Anderson, and David Duchovny had all had their heads laser scanned to create digital computer models thereof.

People who had already been digitally cloned as simulations using conventional CGI techniques by 2002 include Bill Clinton, Marilyn Monroe, Fred Astaire, Ed Sullivan, Elvis Presley, Bruce Lee, Audrey Hepburn, Anna Marie Goddard, and George Burns.

By the 21st century, virtual actors had become a reality. The face of Brandon Lee, who had died partway through the shooting of The Crow in 1994, had been digitally superimposed over the top of a body-double in order to complete those parts of the movie that had yet to be filmed. By 2001, three-dimensional computer-generated realistic humans had been used in Final Fantasy: The Spirits Within, and by 2004, a synthetic Laurence Olivier co-starred in Sky Captain and the World of Tomorrow.

Rogue One: A Star Wars Story (2016) featured CGI-created versions of Grand Moff Tarkin and a young Princess Leia, produced by Industrial Light & Magic. The film was nominated for the Academy Award for Best Visual Effects. Despite this recognition, director Gareth Edwards acknowledged that something about the Tarkin character did not feel entirely right, and concluded: "This idea that computers are going to replace actors ... That’s not going to happen anytime soon." Eliana Dockterman of Time wrote that "there was something particularly plastic about this version of the young Carrie Fisher (Princess Leia)—so smooth and so perfect it couldn't be real—that pulled me out of the moment."

== Generative AI and AI-generated actors (2018–present) ==
After 2010, deep learning and neural rendering became an important and cost-effective alternative to classic manual 3D CGI development. In 2018, video artist Joseph Ayerle used deepfake technology and created an AI-generated actor, a digital replica of Italian movie star Ornella Muti for his time-travel short film Un'emozione per sempre 2.0. In 2019, the Dalí Museum in St. Petersburg, Florida, introduced a virtual Salvador Dalí, created using deepfake AI technology. The virtual Dalí greets visitors and talks about his art.

In Martin Scorsese's 2019 film The Irishman, hybrid CGI and AI technology was used for the digital 'de-aging' of actors such as Robert De Niro. Amid widespread public discussion surrounding artificial intelligence, publications such as The Guardian and the blog of graphic card manufacturer Nvidia gave the impression that this digital de-aging was generated by AI. In fact, the de-aging in The Irishman was based on traditional 3D/CGI models, the new camera system Flux, and standard rendering techniques. A specialized AI program named AI Face Finder served as a control tool to compare the CGI-rendered scenes with historical footage. In this case, the AI only had a supervisory role. It didn't create scenes from archive material like the virtual replicas of Ornella Muti and Dalí.

In 2021, a viral digital actor in the likeness of Tom Cruise appeared on YouTube and TikTok, which unlike Joseph Ayerle's virtual Ornella Muti from 2018 and the artificial Salvador Dalí from 2019 looked absolutely real: The digital replica of Tom Cruise could be seen playing golf, doing magic tricks, or telling anecdotes, with his facial expressions, laughter, and gestures matching the real Tom Cruise to perfection. Behind the project were two professional creators: In front of the camera was the US-American actor and comedian Miles Fisher, who already bears a striking natural resemblance to Tom Cruise and is a talented impersonator. The Belgian special effects artist Chris Ume was responsible for the postproduction. He processed the videos using an advanced version of deepfake technology. Due to its deceptive realism, the project was considered a technical milestone and intensified the discussion surrounding the dangers of the malicious use of digital replicas of real people.

Unlike in Europe and Hollywood, commercial film production in China saw an intensive development of AI-generated actors starting in 2023, which took place within a typically Chinese genre: the microdrama. Duanju (Chinese: 短剧; pinyin: duǎn jù; sometimes translated in English as microdrama, short drama, vertical drama, vertical minidrama, vertical series, or mobile drama) is a type of short form web or television series that originated in China. The series typically feature 1–2 minute episodes. In 2023, the Chinese television series I Am Nobody featured the appearance of a digital avatar named Lili Ziren (Leah) alongside human actors.

In 2025, commercial British studio Particle6 launched a campaign to promote their photorealistic AI-generated virtual actress named Tilly Norwood. The project attracted media attention and drew criticism from Whoopi Goldberg and actor Morgan Freeman. The labor union SAG-AFTRA criticized that AI models were trained on the moving pictures of human actors, without compensation.

In 2025, as discussions surrounding fully AI-generated actors in filmmaking arose, director James Cameron found the idea of AI-generated virtual actors replacing human actors completely “horrifying”. Cameron, who is known for special effects milestones like Titanic, Avatar, and Terminator 2: Judgment Day, expressed that this approach was the exact opposite of the work he did.

In late 2026, theaters in China released the country's first fully AI-generated commercial feature film, a film without humans actors. The movie, titled "Sanxingdui: Future Past", was a box office flop. It earned 1.7 million yuan (about $250,000 USD) at the box office, but cost several million yuan to produce.

=== Star Wars ===
Since the mid-2010s, the Star Wars franchise has become particularly notable for its prominent usage of virtual actors, driven by a desire in recent entries to reuse characters that first appeared in the original trilogy during the late 1970s and early 1980s.

The 2016 Star Wars Anthology film Rogue One: A Star Wars Story is a direct prequel to the 1977 film Star Wars: A New Hope, with the ending scene of Rogue One leading almost immediately into the opening scene of A New Hope. As such, Rogue One called for Industrial Light & Magic to make digital recreations of certain characters so they would look the same as they did in A New Hope, specifically the roles of Peter Cushing as Grand Moff Tarkin (played and voiced by Guy Henry) and Carrie Fisher as Princess Leia (played by Ingvild Deila and voiced by an archive recording of Fisher). Cushing had died in 1994, while Fisher was not available to play Leia during production and died a few days after the film's release.

Similarly, the 2020 second season of The Mandalorian briefly featured a digital recreation of Mark Hamill's character Luke Skywalker (played by an uncredited body double and voiced by an audio deepfake recreation of Hamill's voice) as portrayed in the 1983 film Return of the Jedi. Canonically, The Mandalorian's storyline takes place roughly five years after the events of Return of the Jedi.

== Legal issues ==
Critics such as Stuart Klawans in the New York Times expressed worry about the loss of "the very thing that art was supposedly preserving: our point of contact with the irreplaceable, finite person". Even more problematic are the issues of copyright and personality rights. Actors have little legal control over a digital clone of themselves. In the United States, for instance, they must resort to database protection laws in order to exercise what control they have. (The proposed Database and Collections of Information Misappropriation Act would strengthen such laws.) An actor does not own the copyright on their digital clones, unless the clones were created by them. Robert Patrick, for example, would not have any legal control over the liquid metal digital clone of himself that was created for Terminator 2: Judgment Day.

The use of digital clones in the movie industry, to replicate the acting performances of a cloned person, represents a controversial aspect of these implications, as it may cause real actors to land in fewer roles, and put them at a disadvantage in contract negotiations, since a clone could always be used by the producers at potentially lower costs. It is also a career difficulty, since a clone could be used in roles that a real actor would not accept for various reasons. Both Tom Waits and Bette Midler have won actions for damages against people who employed their images in advertisements that they had refused to take part in themselves.

In the US, the use of a digital clone in advertisements is required to be accurate and truthful (section 43(a) of the Lanham Act and which makes deliberate confusion unlawful). The use of a celebrity's image would be an implied endorsement. The United States District Court for the Southern District of New York held that an advertisement employing a Woody Allen impersonator would violate the Act unless it contained a disclaimer stating that Allen did not endorse the product.

Other concerns include posthumous use of digital clones. Even before Brandon Lee was digitally reanimated, the California Senate drew up the Astaire Bill, in response to lobbying from Fred Astaire's widow and the Screen Actors Guild, who were seeking to restrict the use of digital clones of Astaire. Movie studios opposed the legislation, and as of 2002 it had yet to be finalized and enacted. Several companies, including Virtual Celebrity Productions, have purchased the rights to create and use digital clones of various dead celebrities, such as Marlene Dietrich and Vincent Price.

== In fiction ==
- S1m0ne, a 2002 science fiction drama film written, produced and directed by Andrew Niccol, starring Al Pacino where he created a computer-generated woman which he can easily animate to play the film's central character.
- The Congress, a 2013 science fiction drama film written, produced and directed by Ari Folman, starring Robin Wright deals with this issue extensively.
- In Tokumei Sentai Go-Busters, the Metaloid Filmloid created evil clones of the Go-Busters. In Power Rangers Beast Morphers, they were adopted as the Evil Beast Morpher Ranger clones created by Filmloid's English-adapted equivalent Gamertron.
- Digital clones and virtual actors have been used in Black Mirror:
  - In the episode "USS Callister," Callister Inc.'s CTO Robert Daly (portrayed by Jesse Plemons) uses the DNA samples he secretly obtains from discarded items used by his Callister Inc. co-workers to create sentient digital clones through his Digital Clone Replicator to be his crew member on the titular spaceship in his modded version of the MMORPG video game Infinity which Callister Inc. created.
  - In the episode "Joan is Awful", it follows Joan Tait (portrayed by Annie Murphy) whose life is adapted in real-time into a television series starring Salma Hayek using CGI-based virtual actors and real-time data gathered from Joan's devices.
  - In the episode "Hotel Reverie", it centers around the actress Brenda Fine (portrayed by Issa Rae) who stars in a remake of a 1940s romance film by acting in a simulation alongside AI versions of the characters through an immersive AI-based virtual production technology.
  - In the episode "USS Callister: Into Infinity" (the sequel to "USS Callister"), it was revealed that Callister Inc's CEO James Walton (portrayed by Jimmi Simpson) had known about the Digital Clone Replicator as he and Daly used it to make a digital clone of Daly (also portrayed by Jesse Plemmons) to update and expand Infinity.
- Late game developer Kenji Eno had his recurring digital character Laura, a blond female who was the protagonist in his series of games published by Warp with her playing different characters in each game: Laura Harris in D, Laura Lewis in Enemy Zero, and Laura Parton in D2. She has made one official appearance outside of her games in the August 1999 issue of High Fashion Magazine (written as "HF" for short) only in Japan and modelled 3D clothes designed by Japanese fashion designer Yohji Yamamoto. The commercial failure of her final game, followed by Eno's later passing in 2013, effectively put an end to her career since. Laura is considered to be the first example of a digital actress in gaming.
- With the CGI animated film Final Fantasy: Spirits Within, the film's director Hironobu Sakaguchi had intended for the lead character Aki Ross to appear as a digital actress in several future films from studio Square Pictures, the film's production company. Due to the film's commercial failure and the studio's closure, Aki has not appeared in or been motioned for any other projects, though she did make two appearances outside of the film including a photo spread in Maxim magazine and in The Animatrix, sporting a crew cut and clad in a black leather bodysuit, in a short 1:15 minute demonstration video that Square Pictures presented to the Wachowskis before making Final Flight of the Osiris. This video is available on The Animatrix DVD in the bonus data section and shows her facing and defeating a Sentinel in hand-to-hand combat.
- The 2009 videogame Eat Lead: The Return of Matt Hazard and the 2010 sequel Matt Hazard: Blood Bath and Beyond stars virtual actor Matt Hazard, who in story is a legendary video game character with over 25 years of video games to his credit, who is attempting a "comeback" of sorts in a new game on (then) next-generation consoles. In the introduction, Matt explains the history of his games, revealing that he accidentally caused his own downfall by taking his name into other genres, resulting in him ruining his reputation by putting himself in kid-friendly games. Matt himself, along with numerous characters in-game that he interacts with, are all aware of their presence in both the digital and real world.

== See also ==
- Avatar (computing)
- De-aging in film and television#Virtual actors in motion pictures
- Deepfake
- Digital cloning
- Live2D
- On-set virtual production
- Synthetic media
- Timeline of computer animation in film and television
- Timeline of CGI in film and television
- Uncanny valley
- Virtual band
- Virtual cinematography
- Virtual human
- Virtual influencer
- Virtual newscaster
- VTuber
