= Dream Flight =

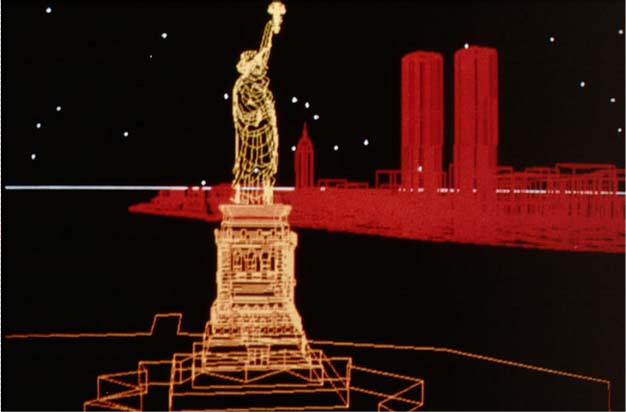
- Frame from Dream Flight.
- Directed by: Philippe Bergeron; Nadia Magnenat Thalmann; Daniel Thalmann
- Written by: Philippe Bergeron; Pierre Lachapelle
- Production company: Université de Montréal
- Release date: 1982
- Running time: 8 minutes
- Country: Canada

Dream Flight (Vol De Rêve) is a 3-D computer-animated short fiction film completely produced by computer. The film was created in 1982 at the University of Montreal and was directed by Philippe Bergeron, Nadia Magnenat Thalmann and Daniel Thalmann.

== Plot ==
It is the story of a creature living on another planet and dreaming that he flies across space like a bird and arrives on Earth. Typical scenes are set in Paris and New York. Others show natural scenes such as ocean, trees, and birds.

== Production ==
The film was programmed using the MIRA graphical language, an extension of the Pascal programming language based on Abstract Graphical Data Types.

== Awards ==
The film was shown at the SIGGRAPH '82 Art Show and the SIGGRAPH ’83 Electronic Theater and received several awards including:

- First Award, Computer Graphics, Online, 1982
- Golden Sheaf Award, Yorkton Short Film and Video Festival, Canada, 1983
- Special Award, Murcia Film-Festival, Spain, 1984
- Chris Award, 32nd Annual Columbus International Film Festival (Ohio, USA), 1984
- Special Award, Facets Multimedia, Chicago, 1985
- Raster Technologies award 1986
