= Computer Animation and Social Agents =

International conference

Computer Animation and Social Agents (CASA) was founded in 1988 in Geneva, Switzerland, and it is the oldest international conference in computer animation and social agents in the world.

== Venues ==
Conference	Venue	Country	Papers
CASA 2025	Strasbourg	France	CASA 2025
CASA 2024	Wuhan, China	China	CASA 2024
CASA 2023	The St. Raphael Resort, Limassol	Cyprus	CAVW 34.3/4
CASA 2022	Nanjing	China	CAVW 33.3/4
CASA 2021	University of Ottawa (virtual)	Canada	CAVW 32.3/4
CASA 2020	Bournemouth University (virtual)	UK	CAVW 31.4/5
CASA 2019	Sorbonne University, Paris	France	CAVW 30.3/4
CASA 2018	ISCAS, Beijing	China	CAVW 29.3/4
CASA 2017	K-Hotel Seoul	Korea	CAVW 28.3/4
CASA 2016	University of Geneva	Switzerland	CAVW 27.3/4
CASA 2015	Nanyang Technological University	Singapore	CAVW 26.3/4
CASA 2014	University of Houston	USA	CAVW 25.3/4
CASA 2013	Bilkent University, Sabancı University, and Microsoft Turkey	Turkey	CAVW 24.3/4
CASA 2012	Nanyang Technological University	Singapore	CAVW 23.3/4
CASA 2011	University of Electronic Science and Technology	China	CAVW 22.2/3
CASA 2010	Palais du Grand-Large, Saint-Malo	France	CAVW 21.3/4
CASA 2009	Het Trippenhuis, Amsterdam	The Netherlands	CAVW 20.2/3
CASA 2008	Grand Hilton Seoul	Korea	CAVW 19.3/4
CASA 2007	Hasselt University	Belgium	CAVW 18.4/5
CASA 2006	University of Geneva	Switzerland	CAVW 17.3/4
CASA 2005	The Hong Kong Polytechnic University	Hong Kong	CAVW 16.3/4
CASA 2004	Geneva	Switzerland	CAVW 15.3/4
CASA 2003	Rutgers University, New Jersey	USA	---
