= Rendez-vous in Montreal =

Rendez-vous in Montreal is a 1987 animated film that used advanced computer techniques to achieve such effects as modelling the film stars Marilyn Monroe and Humphrey Bogart. The film was directed by Nadia Magnenat Thalmann and Daniel Thalmann and produced with a team of 10 people. Specific interactive software ^{[1]} was developed that allowed designers to interactively use commands to generate the sequences. The main purpose of Rendez-vous in Montreal was to show that true synthetic actors can be created. This film represented a technological breakthrough both on the software side and the film itself.

== Plot ==
The movie begins in the hereafter, where Humphrey is bored and longs to live again. He thinks of Marilyn; he calls her many times and begs her to return to Earth with him. The head of Marilyn grown old appears: she accepts. Humphrey then sets up a rendezvous with her for the next day at 10 o'clock at the Bonsecours Market in Montreal. Both actors disappear in the night while making faces at each other. They come down from a starry sky into the Bonsecours Market; we hear footsteps and the sounds of the city in the background. We do not see Humphrey but we hear him think out loud. He hesitates, he looks about for the entrance, he finds it and enters the building. We come to a room where we see a clock that strikes 10 times, reminding us that time is a factor again. Marilyn appears motionless and made of marble. She has not returned to life yet. In reply to Humphrey’s questions, she turns into gold. Humphrey fancies her and sends her a kiss that awakens her. She appears in all her splendor. They take each other's hands and the romance begins.

== Techniques ==
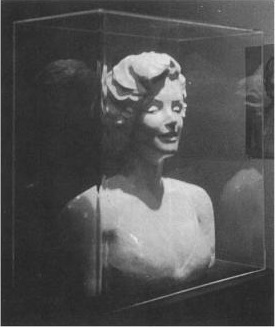
Marilyn’s plaster model for digitizing and 3D reconstruction

3D models of Marilyn and Humphrey were created by drawing polygons and vertices on Marilyn’s and Humphrey’s sculptures and digitizing photos from these plaster models.

At the beginning, the computer needs to know the shapes of the characters, even the detail of their hands or their thumbs. For example, a sculptor sculpted Marilyn's and Humphrey's hands by covering real human hands with plaster, a grid was drawn, photos from various angles were taken, and the information was digitized in 2D and the computer reconstituted the 3D information. For the heads and torsos, a sculptor created 3D plaster models and the process of digitizing is the same.

The system used for the production of the film was Human Factory ^{[1]}. A making of Rendez-vous in Montreal was done that explained all these pioneer methods.

The most important parts of the software developed was:

- The body motion control based on keyframe animation and inverse kinematics
- The skinning system based on Joint-Local dependent Operators (JLD), which is recognized as the original classical skeleton-based deformation algorithm.

The facial animation is based on 3 levels:

1. The low level based on specialized procedures called abstract muscles action (AMA) procedures that work on specific regions of the human face,.
2. The expression level consisting of phonemes and emotions.
3. The script level corresponding to the facial animation.

== Release ==
The film premiered in May 1987 at the Engineering Institute of Canada Centennial Convention, which was attended by about 3000 delegates; excerpts were shown on six television channels the same week. Outside Canada, the first show was at Computer Graphics International '87 at Karuirawa, in Japan, and large excerpts were shown on the News Watch 9 program (NHK). The film has been shown at several festivals, including the Banff Mountain Film Festival, the Hiroshima International Animation Festival, the Montreal World Film Festival, the Women Film Festival in Hollywood, the Rio de Janeiro Festival, the Abitibi-Temiscamingue Festival, the Monte-Carlo Television Festival and the Stuttgart Festival Of Animated Films. It was shown throughout the summer of 1987 at Montreal's EXPOTECH, the largest scientific exhibition ever held in Canada.

== Impact ==
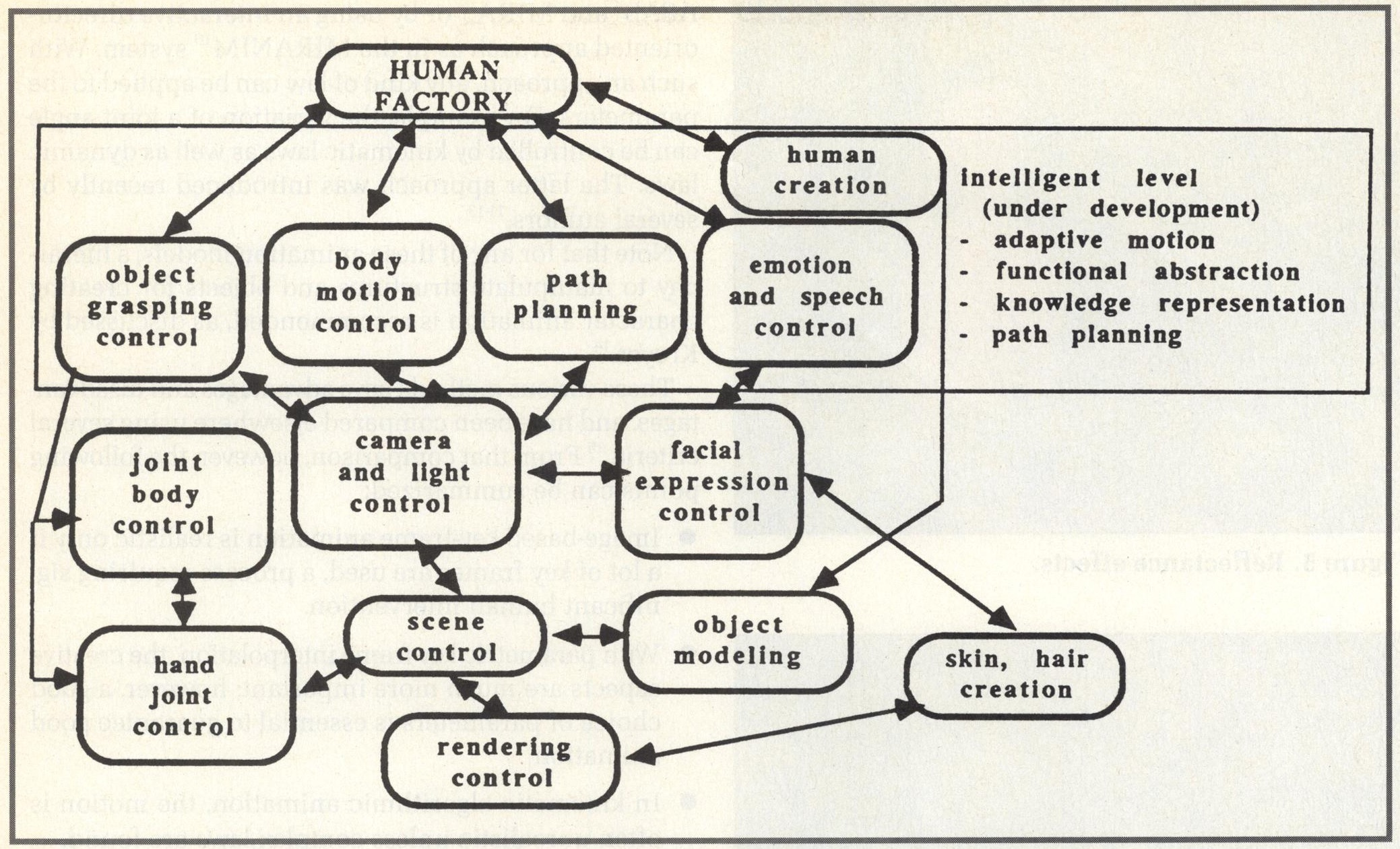
The human factory system used for the production of Rendez-vous in Montreal

Marilyn Monroe and Humphrey Bogart in Rendez-vous in Montreal are considered as the first celebrities (Virtual actors) to be digitally duplicated. The short movie has shown that new movies could be created with actors who never played together as it was the case with Marilyn and Humphrey. Once such a celebrity has been recreated, it can be also used in an autonomous way for other purpose, e.g. Marilyn was also used as a referee for a tennis match.

The movie had also a legal impact as some lawyers started to discuss the postmortem rights of digitized celebrities asking questions as: "How do you protect imaginary humans? Can they have their own right of publicity?" Such questions remain at the forefront of virtual acting today.
