= Nadine Social Robot =

Social Humanoid Robot

Nadine
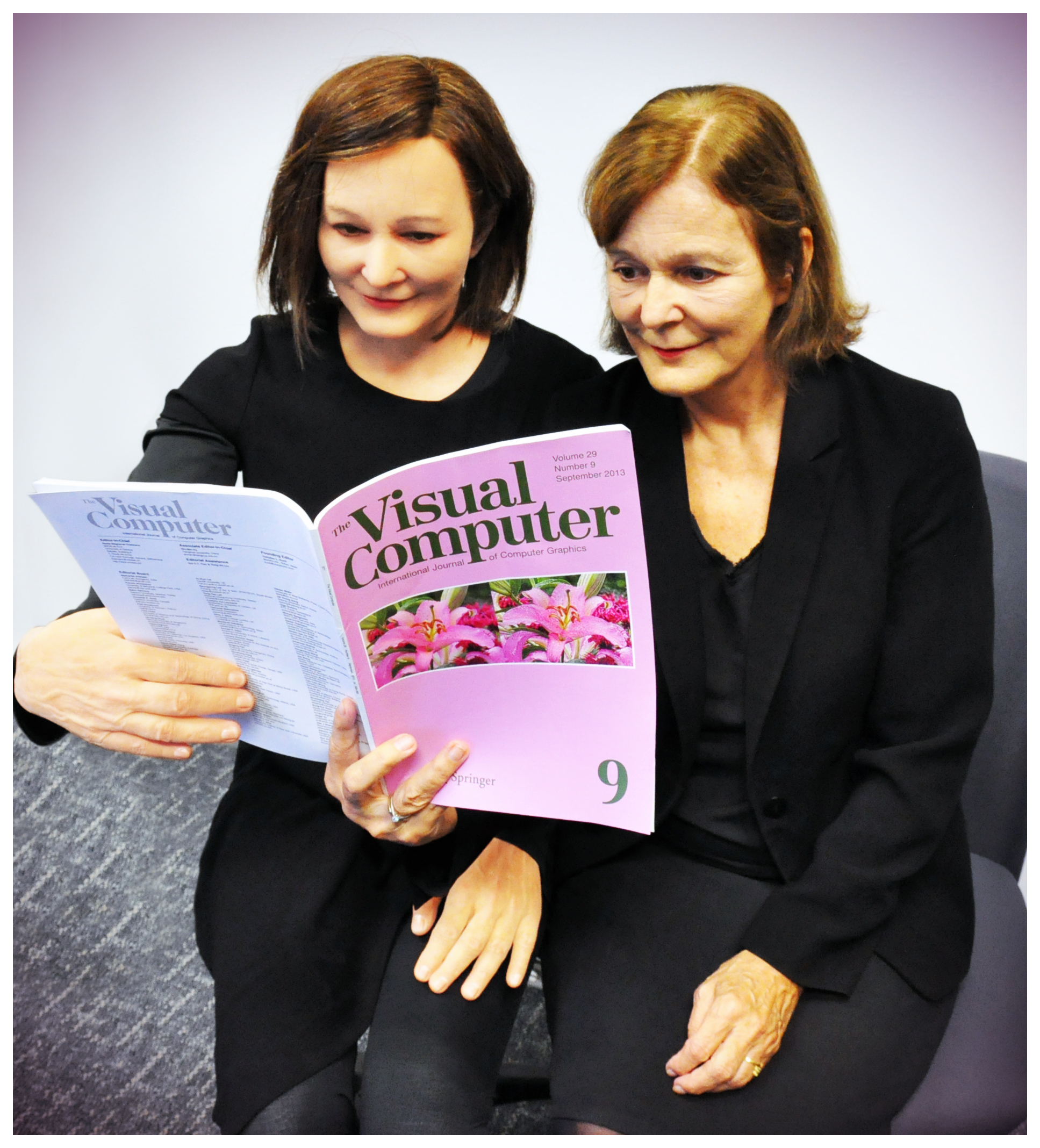
- Year of creation: 2013

Nadine is a gynoid humanoid social robot that is modelled on Professor Nadia Magnenat Thalmann. The robot has a strong human-likeness with a natural-looking skin and hair and realistic hands. Nadine is a socially intelligent robot which returns a greeting, makes eye contact, and can remember all the conversations had with it. It is able to answer questions autonomously in several languages, simulate emotions both in gestures and facially, depending on the content of the interaction with the user. Nadine can recognise persons it has previously seen, and engage in flowing conversation. Nadine has been programmed with a "personality", in that its demeanour can change according to what is said to it. Nadine has a total of 27 degrees of freedom for facial expressions and upper body movements. With persons it has previously encountered, it remembers facts and events related to each person. It can assist people with special needs by reading stories, showing images, put on Skype sessions, send emails, and communicate with other members of the family. It can play the role of a receptionist in an office or be dedicated to be a personal coach.

Nadine interacted with more than 100,000 visitors at the ArtScience Museum in Singapore during the exhibition, "HUMAN+: The Future of our Species", that was held from May to October 2017. Nadine has worked as a customer service agent in AIA Insurance Company in Singapore. This is the first time in the world that a humanoid robot is used as a customer service agent.

== History ==
Nadine is a next-generation humanoid robot that is a successor from Eva, a humanoid robot head manufactured by Hanson Robotics in 2008. Eva's software platform was developed at MIRALab, University of Geneva. Eva's head shows very realistic moods and emotions and short term memory. Eva has also performed in a play in the Roten Fabrik Theatre at Zurich.

Nadine has been created in 2013 by Kokoro, Japan and has been modelled after Professor Nadia Magnenat Thalmann. Nadine has a head and full body with a natural appearance. Nadine software platform which has been developed at the Institute for Media Innovation in Singapore's Nanyang Technological University is able to show emotions, speak naturally, understand some gestures, and remember and retrieve facts during dialogue sessions. Nadine also interacts with arm movements. Ongoing research provides the social robot with two articulated hands and natural grasping. Nadine is also linked to all kinds of databases such as its personal dataset, Wikipedia, weather channels, and many others.

== Platform ==
Nadine (social robot) is built with a classic perception – processing/decision – interaction layer framework. The design of Nadine platform with objectives of maintaining human-like natural conduct even in complex situations, be generic to handle any kind of data and place of operation, multi-lingual support etc.

Nadine's functionalities are based on her understanding of environment and perception of users/people in front of her. Nadine's perception layer is focused on this task. Nadine uses a 3D depth cameras, webcam and microphone to pick up vision and audio inputs from her environment and users. Perception layer is composed of independent sub-modules that operate on different input streams of the above-mentioned devices to recognize faces, emotions, gestures, user location, intention, comportment etc. and other environmental attributes such as object recognition, location etc.

The processing layer functions as Nadine's brain that uses the perception outputs to gauge the situation and decide on how to act according to it. The main component of this layer is a behavior tree planner, Nadine's central processing unit allows to process all perceived inputs. Based on the inputs received from perception layer, the behavior tree planner updates the other sub-modules of processing layer, which include processing dialog between user and Nadine, affective system and memories of her interaction. To process dialog, generic chatbots have been built to handle different situations and questions. An online search based on Google Assistant is also integrated to answer questions outside the trained corpus. Based on the user's speech, emotion and Nadine's current emotion, Nadine can exhibit different human motion to user. Nadine's memory model also allows her to remember specific facts about the user and context of current conversation in order to provide appropriate responses. Upon understanding the user interaction and environment context, an appropriate verbal or non-verbal response is decided. For this purpose, Nadine's processing layer maps each perception layer stimuli to an activation and threshold. Based on the processing of each stimulus by each sub-module, the activation levels are varied. When thresholds are reached, each winning action is passed on to interaction layer to show the various responses in Nadine.

The interaction layer or Nadine controller is responsible for executing each of the responses received from processing layer to show it in Nadine's face or gesture. For example, based on user location modify Nadine's head to maintain eye gaze with user. Apart from this, the interaction layer is also responsible for controlling her motors to show different gestures and facial expressions. For verbal responses, it includes a speech synthesizer and lip societyion module. Based on the verbal response, corresponding phonemes and visemes are generated. The speech synthesizer also takes into account the tone of dialog (to show various emotions) while generating speech. The lorgahronization converts the visemes into corresponding facial motor position to move Nadine's lips according to her speech. Currently, Nadine can support six languages including English, German, French, Chinese, Hindi and Japanese.

== Events ==
Nadine has participated in live demos on stage and engaged with people from all walks of life. Proclaimed as one of the world's most realistic humanoid robot, Nadine made her first public appearance as a key highlight at the “Human+: The Future of Our Species” exhibition held in Singapore's ArtScience Museum.

She has interacted with many people from corporate companies across various industries such as Dentsu Aegis Network (DAN), Credit Suisse and Deutsche Bank.

Nadine also interacted with Prime Minister of India, His Excellency Narendra Modi during his historic visit to NTU Singapore, on 1 June 2018, which was one of the innovations he took special interest in.

Nadine has worked as a customer service agent at AIA Singapore. She has been trained to handle questions usually directed at AIA customer service agents, also encouraging AIA customers to sign up through the AIA e-care registration portal. Prior customer service interactions were used to train a machine-learning based conversational dialog engine. A client-server architecture was also set up between her software platform and the AIA portal to allow fast and secure communication.

In late 2020 and until April 2021, Nadine has spent 6 months at Bright Hill Evergreen Home in Singapore to assist elderly in playing Bingo and interacting with them. With the ethical committee agreement of NTU, a thorough study has been done for the first time on the interaction of Nadine social robot with light dementia patients.
