= Computer Graphics International =

International conference on computer graphics

Computer Graphics International (CGI) is one of the oldest annual international conferences on computer graphics. It is organized by the Computer Graphics Society (CGS). Researchers across the whole world are invited to share their experiences and novel achievements in various fields - like computer graphics and human-computer interaction. Former conferences have been held recently in Hong Kong (China), Geneva (Switzerland), Shanghai (China), Geneva (virtually), Calgary (Canada), Bintan (Indonesia) and Yokohama (Japan).

== Awards ==
Starting in the year of 2013, CGI has given yearly a Best Paper Award and a Career Achievement Award.

== Venues ==
Conference	Location	Country	Papers
CGI’2025	Hong Kong	China	TVC 41.9
CGI’2024	Geneva	Switzerland	TVC 40.7
CGI’2023	Shanghai	China	TVC 39.8
CGI’2022	Geneva (Virtual)	Switzerland	TVC 38.9/11
CGI’2021	Geneva (Virtual)	Switzerland	TVC 37.9/11
CGI’2020	Geneva (Virtual)	Switzerland	TVC 36.10/12
CGI’2019	Calgary	Canada	TVC 35.6/8
CGI’2018	Bintan	Indonesia	TVC 34.6/8
CGI’2017	Yokohama	Japan	TVC 33.6/8
CGI’2016	Crete	Greece	TVC 32.6/8
CGI’2015	Strasbourg	France	TVC 31.6/8
CGI’2014	Sydney	Australia	TVC 30.6/8
CGI’2013	Hannover	Germany	TVC 29.6/8
CGI’2012	Bournemouth	UK	TVC 28.6/8
CGI’2011	Ottawa	Canada	TVC 27.6/8
CGI’2010	Singapore	Singapore	TVC 26.6/8
CGI’2009	Victoria	Canada	TVC 25.5/7
CGI’2008	Istanbul	Turkey	TVC 24.7/9
CGI’2007	Petropolis	Brazil	TVC 23.9/11
CGI’2006	Hangzhou	China	TVC 22.9/11
CGI’2005	Stony Brook	U.S.A.	IEEE 2005
CGI’2004	Heraklion	Greece	IEEE 2004
CGI’2003	Tokyo	Japan	IEEE 2003
CGI’2002	Bradford	UK	Springer 2002
CGI’2001	Hong Kong	Hong Kong	IEEE 2001
CGI’2000	Geneva	Switzerland	IEEE 2000
CGI’1999	Canmore	Canada	IEEE 1999
CGI’1998	Hannover	Garmany	IEEE 1998
CGI’1997	Hasselt	Belgium	IEEE 1997
CGI’1996	Pohang	Korea	IEEE 1996
CGI’1995	Leeds	UK	Elsevier 1995
CGI’1994	Melbourne	Australia	World Scientific 1994
CGI’1993	Lausanne	Switzerland	Springer 1993
CGI’1992	Tokyo	Japan	Springer 1992
CGI’1991	Boston	USA	Springer 1991
CGI’1990	Singapore	Singapore	Springer 1990
CGI’1989	Leeds	UK	Springer 1989
CGI’1988	Geneva	Switzerland	Springer 1988
CGI’1987	Karuizawa	Japan	Springer 1987
CG Tokyo’1986	Tokyo	Japan	Springer 1986
CG Tokyo’1985	Tokyo	Japan	Springer 1985
CG Tokyo’1984	Tokyo	Japan	Springer 1984
InterGraphics’1983	Tokyo	Japan	Springer 1983
