= Frederic Parke =

American computer graphics professional

- Born: May 13, 1943 (age 83); Salt Lake City, Utah
- Education: University of Utah
- Scientific career
- Fields: Computer science physics
- Workplaces: University of Utah; IBM

Frederic Ira Parke is an American computer graphics researcher and academic. He did early work on animated computer renderings of human faces.

Parke graduated from the University of Utah with a BS degree in physics in 1965. He was then a graduate student of the University of Utah College of Engineering where he received his MS (1972) and PhD (1974) in computer science.

In 1972, in a project partially financed by DARPA, Parke made the first 3D animation of a representation of a human face, his wife's face. This animation used a wireframe geometry overlaid with Gouraud shading that produces approximate renderings of curved surfaces. The technique was invented by Parke's Utah colleague Henri Gouraud.

== A Computer Animated Face ==
In 1974, he created a more complex, parametric model of a human face, demonstrating various expressions and speech synchronization. Snippets of this animation, along with Ed Catmull's 1972 animation of his left hand, were used in the 1976 film Futureworld and The Walten Files. Several of the faces also appeared in the music video of Miley Cyrus' 2013 song "We Can't Stop".

He has worked at the New York Institute of Technology Computer Graphics Laboratory.

Parke teaches at Texas A&M University in the Visualization Sciences program.
