= Virtual newscaster =

A virtual newscaster, or also called a virtual host, virtual presenter, virtual teleprompter or virtual anchor is a computer-generated character created for the purpose of reading forth news from a website. While Ananova is often credited to be the first virtual newscaster on the web, it went off-line in 2004. Delta Seven, created by Bruce C. Pippin, uses Microsoft Agent technology to deliver real-time changes in news, weather, sports and stock market quotes in less than seven minutes.

Advantages of having such a character on a website include that it has a more familiar effect on viewers. Also, as newscasters are typically coupled with an audio reading of any article they are featured on, visually impaired or illiterate persons can benefit from this method of information delivery.
