= Daniel Thalmann =

Swiss and Canadian computer scientist

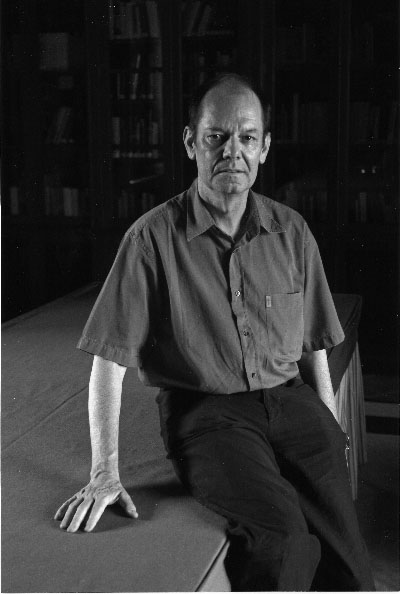
- Citizenship: Switzerland and Canada
- Education: University of Geneva
- Known for: Virtual Humans, Crowd Simulation, Virtual Rehabilitation
- Spouse: Nadia Magnenat Thalmann
- Awards: Dr. Honoris Causa, Paul-Sabatier University, Toulouse, France 2002; Eurographics Distinguished Career Award 2010; Canadian Human Computer Communications Society Achievement Award 2012; CGI Career Award 2015
- Scientific career
- Fields: Computer Science
- Workplaces: Nanyang Technological University; École Polytechnique Fédérale de Lausanne (EPFL); University of Montreal; University of Nebraska–Lincoln

Prof. Daniel Thalmann is a Swiss and Canadian computer scientist and a pioneer in Virtual humans. He is currently Honorary Professor at EPFL, Switzerland and Director of Research Development at MIRALab Sarl in Geneva, Switzerland.

== Biography ==
After a master's degree in Nuclear Physics (1970) and a combined Certificate in Statistics and Computer Science (1972) both from the University of Geneva, he earned a PhD in Computer Science (1977) also from the University of Geneva. In his PhD, he worked very early on the concept of abstract machines for portable compilers and operating systems. From 1977 to 1989, he was Professor at the University of Montreal, in Canada, where he started to work on computer graphics and animation. Then, he came back to Switzerland and founded the virtual reality lab (VRlab) at EPFL, Switzerland. He has been Visiting Professor/ Researcher at CERN, University of Nebraska–Lincoln, University of Tokyo, and National University of Singapore. From 2009 to 2017, he was Visiting Professor at the Institute for Media Innovation, Nanyang Technological University, Singapore. He is co-editor-in-chief of the Journal of Computer Animation and Virtual Worlds, and member of the editorial board of six other journals. Thalmann has published more than 650 papers in graphics, animation, and virtual reality. He is coeditor of 30 books, and coauthor of several books including Crowd Simulation (second edition 2012) and Stepping Into Virtual Reality (second edition 2023), published by Springer.

== Research ==
In the 1980s, Thalmann together with Nadia Magnenat Thalmann became interested in the realistic computer modelling and rendering of the human form, in motion. In 1988, they directed the short film Rendez-vous in Montreal, which is widely regarded as the first computer film to employ synthetic actors, in this case Humphrey Bogart and Marilyn Monroe.

In the 1990s, Thalmann focused his research on behavioural animation of Virtual Humans, introducing the concept of synthetic vision for autonomous virtual humans, and developing methods for realistic gait modelling. In the late 1990s, he launched the first project on crowd simulation of virtual humans, initiating a new field of animation that now attracts many researchers. Rendering of tens of thousands of agents, collision detection and generation of varieties of individual people became important issues. He also introduced, with Marcelo Kallmann, the concept of smart objects as objects that describe their own possible interactions. He recently extended his research from virtual humans to social robots, working in the team on Nadine Social Robot.

Thalmann is also recognized in the area of Virtual Rehabilitation, a term he coined with Professor Grigore Burdea of Rutgers University (US). He has also created with him the International Conference on Virtual Rehabilitation and is a founder of the International Society of Virtual Rehabilitation.

== Awards and honors ==
Thalmann received an Honorary Doctorate (Honoris Causa) from Paul-Sabatier University in Toulouse, France, in 2003. He also received the Eurographics Distinguished Career Award in 2010 and the 2012 Canadian Human Computer Communications Society Achievement Award. In 2015, he received the CGI Career Achievement Award from the Computer Graphics Society (CGS).

== Films/Demos ==
- Nadia Magnenat Thalmann, Daniel Thalmann, Rendez-vous a Montreal, 1987
- Jonathan Maim, Barbara Maim, Daniel Thalmann, Crowd Simulation, 2006
- Helena Grillon, Daniel Thalmann, Attention Crowds, 2007
- EPFL VRLab demos, YouTube Channel
