= Nadia Magnenat Thalmann =

Computer scientist

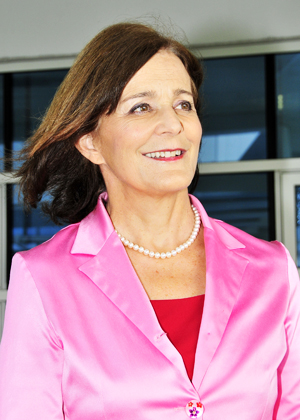
- Thalmann in 2009
- Education: University of Geneva; École Polytechnique Fédérale de Lausanne (EPFL)
- Awards: Humboldt Research Award; The Canadian Human Computer Communications Society Award
- Scientific career
- Fields: Computer Graphics; Virtual Humans; Social Humanoid Robotics
- Workplaces: Université Laval; HEC, University of Montréal; University of Geneva; Nanyang Technological University (NTU)

Nadia Magnenat Thalmann is a computer graphics scientist and roboticist and is the founder and head of MIRALab at the University of Geneva. She has chaired the Institute for Media Innovation at Nanyang Technological University (NTU), Singapore from 2009 to 2021.

== Biography ==
Thalmann received an MS in psychology, an MS in biology and a Master in biochemistry at the University of Geneva. She obtained a PhD in Quantum Physics in 1977 from the same university. She started her career as an assistant professor at the University Laval in Canada, then became a professor at HEC, University of Montreal until 1988. In 1989, she moved to the University of Geneva where she founded the MIRALab laboratory.

Thalmann has authored and co-authored more than 600 papers in the area of Virtual Humans, social robots, VR, and 3D simulation of human articulations. She has participated in more than 45 European research projects. She has served the Computer Graphics community by creating the Computer Animation and Social Agents (CASA) in Geneva in 1988, as well as managing Computer Graphics International (CGI). She is the editor-in-chief of the journal The Visual Computer published by Springer, Germany and co editor-in-chief of the Computer Animation Journal published by Wiley.

== Research ==
Thalmann has made numerous research contributions in the general area of computer graphics and is best known for her work on simulating realistic virtual humans. She also made early contributions in computer graphics during her PhD by simulating and visualizing 3D electronic densities of the Schrödinger equation's approximate solutions (1977).

Later on, she pioneered the modelling of realistic Virtual Humans, particularly producing the first simulation of a 3D version of Marilyn Monroe in the film Rendez-vous in Montreal (1987)

This film was shown in world premiere at the Place des Arts in Montreal to celebrate 100 years of engineering in Canada. She also showed her film at the Modern Art Museum in New York in 1988 along with Canadian computer artists.

She made several original contributions in MRI segmentation methods correlated with clinical findings. She also modelled the simulation of Virtual Ballerinas where their hip cartilage deformations can be visualized while dancing. She further demonstrates see-through knee articulations of real soccer players. Since 2008, she has started at MIRALab, University of Geneva, a research with the humanoid robot EVA and demonstrated a first model of a realistic robot showing emotions and having a memory model. She has worked on the social autonomous robot Nadine, modeled in her image, that is able to speak, recognize people and gestures, express mood and emotions, and remember actions. Nadine has been shown at the ArtScience Museum, in the exhibition HUMAN+: The Future of our Species, in Singapore, which has attracted more than 100 000 visitors.

== Honors and awards ==
=== Honorary degrees ===
- In 2009, she was awarded a Doctor Honoris Causa in Natural sciences from Leibniz University Hannover (2009).
- In 2010, Thalmann was awarded an honorary doctorate from the University of Ottawa.

=== Awards ===
- In July 1987, Thalmann was named "Woman of the Year" by École des hautes études commerciales de Montréal for early original contribution in computer graphics in Montreal (1987).
- In 2007, her film "High Fashion in Equations" has won the CGI 2007 Best International Scientific Video award and was shown at the SIGGRAPH Electronic Theatre.
- In 2012, she has been a co-recipient of the Career Achievement Award by the Canadian Human Computer Communications Society in Toronto.
- In 2012, she received the prestigious Humboldt Research Award in Germany.
- Thalmann selected as a Pioneer in Information Technology at the Heinz Nixdorf Computer Museum's Electronic Wall of Fame in Germany.

== Bibliography ==
- Magnenat-Thalmann, Nadia; Thalmann, Daniel (1987). "The Direction of Synthetic Actors in the Film Rendez-Vous a Montreal". IEEE Computer Graphics and Applications. 7 (12): 9–19. doi:10.1109/MCG.1987.276934. ISSN 1558-1756. S2CID 12591680.
- Magnenat-Thalmann, N.; Primeau, E.; Thalmann, D. (March 1, 1988). "Abstract muscle action procedures for human face animation". The Visual Computer. 3 (5): 290–297. doi:10.1007/BF01914864. ISSN 1432-2315. S2CID 15791501.
- Magnenat-Thalmann, N.; Laperrière, R.; Thalmann, D. (December 1, 1989). "Joint-dependent local deformations for hand animation and object grasping". Proceedings on Graphics Interface '88. CAN: Canadian Information Processing Society: 26–33.
- Kalra, Prem; Mangili, Angelo; Thalmann, Nadia Magnenat; Thalmann, Daniel (1992). "Simulation of Facial Muscle Actions Based on Rational Free Form Deformations". Computer Graphics Forum. 11 (3): 59–69. doi:10.1111/1467-8659.1130059. ISSN 1467-8659. S2CID 8727599.
- Seo, Hyewon; Thalmann, N.M. (2000). "LoD management on animating face models". Proceedings IEEE Virtual Reality 2000 (Cat. No.00CB37048). pp. 161–168. doi:10.1109/VR.2000.840494. ISBN 0-7695-0478-7. S2CID 1426606.
- Carignan, Michel; Yang, Ying; Thalmann, Nadia Magnenat; Thalmann, Daniel (July 1, 1992). "Dressing animated synthetic actors with complex deformable clothes". Proceedings of the 19th annual conference on Computer graphics and interactive techniques. SIGGRAPH '92. New York, NY, USA: Association for Computing Machinery. pp. 99–104. doi:10.1145/133994.134017. ISBN 978-0-89791-479-6. S2CID 7379736.
- Volino, Pascal; Courchesne, Martin; Magnenat Thalmann, Nadia (1995). "Versatile and efficient techniques for simulating cloth and other deformable objects". Proceedings of the 22nd annual conference on Computer graphics and interactive techniques - SIGGRAPH '95. Not Known: ACM Press. pp. 137–144. doi:10.1145/218380.218432. ISBN 978-0-89791-701-8. S2CID 379810.

== Filmography ==
Year	Title	Description
1982	Vol de Rêve (Dream Flight)	3D Computer-generated film, produced with the MIRA Animation system, 13 min., 16mm color, directed by Philippe Bergeron, Nadia Magnenat Thalmann and Daniel Thalmann.
1985	Nirvana	3D Computer-generated film, produced with the MIRANIM system, 4 min., 16mm color, directed by Nadia Magnenat Thalmann and Daniel Thalmann.
1987	Eglantine	3D Computer-generated film, produced with the HUMAN FACTORY system, 3 min., 35mm color, directed by Nadia Magnenat Thalmann and Daniel Thalmann.
1987	Rendez-vous à Montreal	3D Computer-generated film, produced with the HUMAN FACTORY system, 6 min., 35mm color, directed by Nadia Magnenat Thalmann and Daniel Thalmann.
1987	Rendez Vous à Montreal - Making of	Documentary on the making of the 3D Computer-generated film Rendez Vous à Montreal, 14 min 48sec, directed by Nadia Magnenat Thalmann and Daniel Thalmann.
1988	Galaxy Sweetheart	3D Computer-generated film, produced with the HUMAN FACTORY system, 6 min., 35mm color, directed by Nadia Magnenat Thalmann and Daniel Thalmann.
1988	Les îles ont une âme	3D Computer-generated film, produced with the HUMAN FACTORY system, 2 min., 35mm color, directed by Nadia Magnenat Thalmann and Daniel Thalmann.
1990	Iad	3D Computer-generated film, in ray tracing, with hand animation, 3 min., 1 inch video, directed by Nadia Magnenat Thalmann and Daniel Thalmann.
1990	Flashback	3D Computer-generated film, in ray tracing, with cloth animation, 50 sec., 1 inch video, directed by Nadia Magnenat Thalmann and Daniel Thalmann.
1991	Still Walking	3D Computer-generated film, in ray tracing, with walking model, 1 min., 1 inch video, directed by Nadia Magnenat Thalmann and Daniel Thalmann.
1992	Fashion Show	3D Computer-generated film, in ray tracing, with cloth animation, 1 min., 1 inch video, directed by Nadia Magnenat Thalmann.
1993	Marilyn singing	3D Computer Animation film festival, opening sequence, 1 inch video, directed by Nadia Magnenat Thalmann.
1994	Broken dreams	3D Computer-generated film, inspired from the painting made by Hopper, 1 min, directed by Nadia Magnenat Thalmann.
1995	Teleshopping	Real-time performance between Singapore and Geneva (Virtual Shopping) at Telecom`95, directed by Nadia Magnenat Thalmann and Daniel Thalmann.
1995	Mariln by Geneva lake	First film to mix virtual people with real ones on a real setting, directed by Nadia Magnenat Thalmann.
1996	Virtual Marilyn receives the Golden Camera Award	2 min, 1 inch video, Berlin, Germany. Program retransmitted on ZDF, Germany, and Marilyn sequence, directed by Nadia Magnenat Thalmann.
1997	Xian Terracotta Army	3D simulation of the Xian Terracotta soldiers, 1 min 27 sec, directed by Nadia Magnenat Thalmann.
1997	Anyone for Tennis	Interactive Telecom 97, real time demo between Lausanne and Geneva, 2 min, directed by Nadia Magnenat Thalmann and Daniel Thalmann.
1997	Marilyn at the United Nations	Mixed Reality film, 41 sec, directed by Nadia Magnenat Thalmann.
1997	Cyberdance	Mixed reality show presented at Kursaal, Bern, Switzerland, at the official ceremony of the new members of the Swiss Technical Sciences Academy, directed by Nadia Magnenat Thalmann.
1998	Kathy	3D Fashion Show, 1 min., directed by Nadia Magnenat Thalmann.
1998	Fashion Dreams	3 min 33 sec., Mixed-reality live show, Invited presentation at the "Forum de l'hôtellerie Suisse", in Montreux, Switzerland directed by Nadia Magnenat Thalmann.
1998	Orbit	Exhibition of the Marilyn's recreation in 3D in the University of Geneva. This was an interactive project among the Professors from the Research Center. Directed by Nadia Magnenat Thalmann.
1999	Cyborg Frictions	Presentation of “Virtual Self”, Mixed-reality live show, at Kulturhalle Dampfzentrale, Bern, Switzerland, directed by Nadia Magnenat Thalmann.
1999	Charleston Party	3 min 22 sec., Mixed-reality performance, “Hannover Region Stand” in Cebit, Hannover, Germany, directed by Nadia Magnenat Thalmann.
2000	Dancing over the Internet	EU exhibition and conference (IST days conference), real-time performance between Nice, France, and Geneva, Switzerland, directed by Nadia Magnenat Thalmann and Daniel Thalmann.
2000	S.S. Segius and Bacchus Reconstruction 1	Simulation of the Segius and Bacchus mosque in Istanbul. Directed by Nadia Magnenat Thalmann.
2001	The Utopians	2 min 40 sec., Virtual Reality live show, Casino Hilton Geneva, directed by Nadia Magnenat Thalmann.
2001	CAHRISMA	3D modelling of Hagia Sophia Mosque in Istanbul. Directed by Nadia Magnenat Thalmann.
2001	Expressive Speech Animation	Principal components of facial animation for showing emotional speech, with different type of expressions: sad, happy and surprised. Directed by Nadia Magnenat Thalmann.
2001	Interactive Hairstyler	3D Recreation of hair movements with a fluid flow. Directed by Nadia Magnenat Thalmann.
2001	UNILEVER - Walking Models	Last results of the studying of movements, materials and textures on a dress: different essays and perspectives. Directed by Nadia Magnenat Thalmann.
2002	Virtual Life in Pompeii	2 min 37sec, presented at the Intercontinental Hotel in Geneva, Switzerland, directed by Nadia Magnenat Thalmann.
2002	Best Of MIRALab from 1982 to 2002	A video show casing the best productions of MIRALab including some interviews and explanations of our work, directed by Nadia Magnenat Thalmann.
2003	HES Sierre Show	MIRALab's projects. Directed by Nadia Magnenat Thalmann.
2003	Making of “Dream of a Model	7 min., 3D fashion simulation in mixed reality, Musée d’art et d’histoire, Geneva, Switzerland, directed by Nadia Magnenat Thalmann.
2003	The Ballet Dancer	A Virtual rehearsal of a dancer, directed by Nadia Magnenat Thalmann.
2004	Making Of Life Plus	Innovative revival of life in ancient frescos and creation of immersive narrative spaces featuring real scenes with behavioural virtual fauna and flora. Directed by Nadia Magnenat Thalmann and Daniel Thalmann.
2004	Virtual Fashion Show	9 min. 26 sec, live Virtual Fashion show at Athénée 13, Geneva, Switzerland, directed by Nadia Magnenat Thalmann.
2004	PDA Pocket PC	Demonstration of Facial Animation for Pocket computer. Directed by Nadia Magnenat Thalmann.
2004	ERATO	Creation of a virtual restoration and revival of cultural heritage: The Aspendos theatre. Directed by Nadia Magnenat Thalmann.
2004	Modee Virtual Collection	Modee Spring-Summer Collection 2005 from MIRALab: animation video with recreation of a runway. Directed by Nadia Magnenat Thalmann.
2005	High Fashion in Equations	4 min 22 sec, Exhibition at the Musée de la Mode, Yverdon, Switzerland, and presented at SIGGRAPH electronic theatre 2007. Directed by Nadia Magnenat Thalmann.
2005	Reconstruction of bones and muscles	3D reconstruction of bones and muscles is a priority in order to help the medical research. Directed by Nadia Magnenat Thalmann.
2006	Xian Real Time	Xian virtual animation about life and human interaction in ancient times. A MIRALab project in the modeling of cultural heritage in 3D. Directed by Nadia Magnenat Thalmann.
2006	Hair Dance	Recreation of a dancer's movements: hair simulation, cloths design and virtual reality. Directed by Nadia Magnenat Thalmann.
2007	Virtual Hagia Sophia Reconstruction	3D simulation of the interior of Hagia Sophia Mosque in Istanbul. Directed by Nadia Magnenat Thalmann.
2007	HAPTEX cloth simulation	Video showing the Visuo-haptic VR System for interacting with virtual textiles and samples of cloth simulation. Haptic sensing of virtual textiles (HAPTEX) is a European Research project in which MIRALab participates. Directed by Nadia Magnenat Thalmann.
2008	Motion Analysis of the Hip	Modelling the human hip joint in extreme postures. Directed by Nadia Magnenat Thalmann.
2008	Facial Motion Capture	From motion capture to facial animation. Directed by Nadia Magnenat Thalmann.
2008	Ruban 2	Simulation of a textile applied with a waterfall effect. Directed by Nadia Magnenat Thalmann.
2009	A Day in the Life of John Calvin	3D simulation of John Calvin and exhibition at the International Museum of the Reform in Geneva, Switzerland. Directed by Nadia Magnenat Thalmann.
2009	Virtual Hip Joint	Eurographics Medical 1st Prize, 2009, directed by Nadia Magnenat Thalmann.
2009	La danse dans tous ses états	Live show performed in Geneva for the 450th anniversary of the university. The professional ballet dancer dances with her 3D avatar, directed by Nadia Magnenat Thalmann.
2010	Biomechanical Analysis of the Hip Joint	Investigating the link between extreme movements and hip, directed by Nadia Magnenat Thalmann.
2010	Interactive Media with Personal Networked Devices	Demonstration on the dynamic reconfigurable wearable interfaces for personal health data analysis, directed by Nadia Magnenat Thalmann.
2011	Virtual and Live Fashion Show	New Media Village @ IMI, Singapore directed by Nadia Magnenat Thalmann.
2011	Social Robotics	Presentation of Eva Robot, a humanoid robot head with software platform developed at MIRALab, Switzerland, directed by Nadia Magnenat Thalmann.
2012	The Illusion of Intelligence	AAAI Video Competition 2012, Best Student Video Award. Produced by Karolina Zawieska, Bart Kevelham, Maher Ben Moussa and Nadia Magnenat Thalmann.
2012	SIGGRAPH ASIA 2012 Fashion Show	5th ACM SIGGRAPH Conference and Exhibition on Computer Graphics and Interactive Techniques in Asia, Singapore. Directed by Nadia Magnenat Thalmann.
2012	IMI Mixed Reality Fashion Show	Swissnex Singapore End of 2012 Party, Singapore, directed by Nadia Magnenat Thalmann.
2013	Real-time Interaction with Nadine Humanoid Robot	Swissnex Singapore End of 2013 Party, Singapore, directed by Nadia Magnenat Thalmann.
2013	Refurbish a single user 3D application into a multi-user distributed service	Demonstration on a single user 3D application into a multi-user distributed service, a software platform developed at MIRALab, University Of Geneva, Switzerland, directed by Nadia Magnenat Thalmann, Yvain Tisserand and Niels Nijdam.
2014	A Facebook-aware Virtual Human Interface	Demonstration on Virtual Human, a software platform developed at IMI, NTU, Singapore, directed by Nadia Magnenat Thalmann.
2014	Sound Localization and Classification	Demonstration on sound localization by Virtual Human, a software platform developed at IMI, NTU, Singapore, directed by Nadia Magnenat Thalmann.
2014	Affective Memory and Dialogue	Demonstration of affective memory and dialogue, on Nadine Social Robot, a software platform developed at IMI, NTU, Singapore, directed by Nadia Magnenat Thalmann.
2015	3D Multiscale Subject Specific Soccer Player	MultiScale Human project, directed by Nadia Magnenat Thalmann.
2015	Multiscale Biological Modalities for physiological human articulation	MultiScale Human project, directed by Nadia Magnenat Thalmann.
2016	Attention Control of Realistic Humanoid Robot	Demonstration performed with Nadine Social Robot, directed by Nadia Magnenat Thalmann.
2016	Nadine and Nadia	Nadia Magnenat Thalmann interacting with Nadine Social Robot by reading a journal together, directed by Nadia Magnenat Thalmann.
2016	Nadine Introduction	Nadine Social Robot demonstrates her capabilities, directed by Nadia Magnenat Thalmann.
2016	Human Robot Interaction by Upper Body Gesture Understanding	Recognition of human gestures by Nadine Social Robot, directed by Nadia Magnenat Thalmann.
2016	Nadine Interaction	Interaction with Nadine Social Robot, directed by Nadia Magnenat Thalmann.
2016	2016 ACI Asia Business Summit - Live Call with Nadine	Interaction on stage with Nadine Social Robot during the 2016 ACI Asia Business Summit, Raffles City Convention Centre, Singapore. Directed by Nadia Magnenat Thalmann.
2016	Reusable low-cost platform for digitizing and preserving traditional participative sports	Video demonstration on a reusable low-cost platform for digitizing and preserving traditional participative sports. Directed by Nadia Magnenat Thalmann.
2017	The robot EVA playing in the Roten Fabrik theatre at Zurich	Robot Eva has also performed in a play in the Roten Fabrik Theatre at Zurich., produced by Nadia Magnenat Thalmann.
2017	Nadine Social Robot	A short trailer of Nadine Social Robot at IMI, NTU, Singapore. Directed by Nadia Magnenat Thalmann.
2017	The Making Of Nadine Hand	A video showing the process in the making of Nadine's hand. Directed by Nadia Magnenat Thalmann.
2017	ArtScience Museum Human+	Nadine Social Robot, at the ArtScience Museum, Singapore. Directed by Nadia Magnenat Thalmann.
2017	Nadine Social Robot conversation with a student, Felix	A demonstration on Nadine Social Robot having a conversation with a student. Directed by Nadia Magnenat Thalmann.
2018	Nadine Social Robot at AIA Insurance Company	Nadine Social Robot starting work as a receptionist in AIA Insurance Company in Singapore. Directed by Nadia Magnenat Thalmann.
2018	AIA Opening Ceremony	Opening Ceremony at AIA Finlayson Green. Directed by Nadia Magnenat Thalmann.
