= Alex Ma =

Taiwanese software engineer

Wan-Chun Alex Ma (Chinese: 馬萬鈞; pinyin: Mǎ Wànjūn; born 1978) is a Taiwanese software engineer. He has a passion for computer graphics, computer vision, visual effects, and machine learning.

== Early life and education ==
Ma was born in 1978. Ma became interested in visual effects at a young age, influenced by the Star Wars film series and Wing Commander III: Heart of the Tiger, a video game released in 1994. He completed his bachelor's, master's, and doctoral degrees at National Taiwan University. With the help of the Graduate Student Study Abroad Program of Taiwan's National Science Council. Ma went to the University of Southern California in 2005, completing his studies under Paul Debevec at the Institute for Creative Technologies.

Ma stated that transitioning to working in the United States was difficult as he initially had difficulty understanding his colleagues and boss. In order to overcome this language barrier Ma stated he watched American talk shows at the local gym. After completing his work at University of Southern California and his doctoral degree at National Taiwan University in September, 2008 Ma began his mandatory military service for Taiwans Ministry of Defense. He served as a Private E-2 Trombone Player in the elite Ministry of National Defense Symphony Orchestra (MNDSO) until July, 2009.

== Career ==
Since obtaining his doctorate, Ma has worked for Weta Digital, Activision Blizzard, Google, ByteDance, and is currently working for Meta His team from the University of California and him are the creators of the Facial Appearance Capture Method.

Debevec's research team, including Ma, developed the Polarized Spherical Gradient Illumination, a facial appearance capture and modeling technology. This technology has been used in several films, including Avatar, The Curious Case of Benjamin Button, Dawn of the Planet of the Apes, Iron Man 3, and Furious 7. In 2019, the 91st Academy Awards awarded Ma and his team the Scientific and Technical Achievement Award to recognize their contributions. He is the second Taiwanese to ever win an Oscar, the first being director Ang Lee.

As part of his work for Weta Digital, a New Zealand based company, he made contributions to other digital media including The Lord of the Rings, as well as in his role at Activision Blizzard.

== Awards and honors ==
- (2019). Academy Award for Technical Achievement
- (2000). IEEE Computer Society International Design Competition 2nd Place: Family Health Guard
