= Gonioreflectometer =

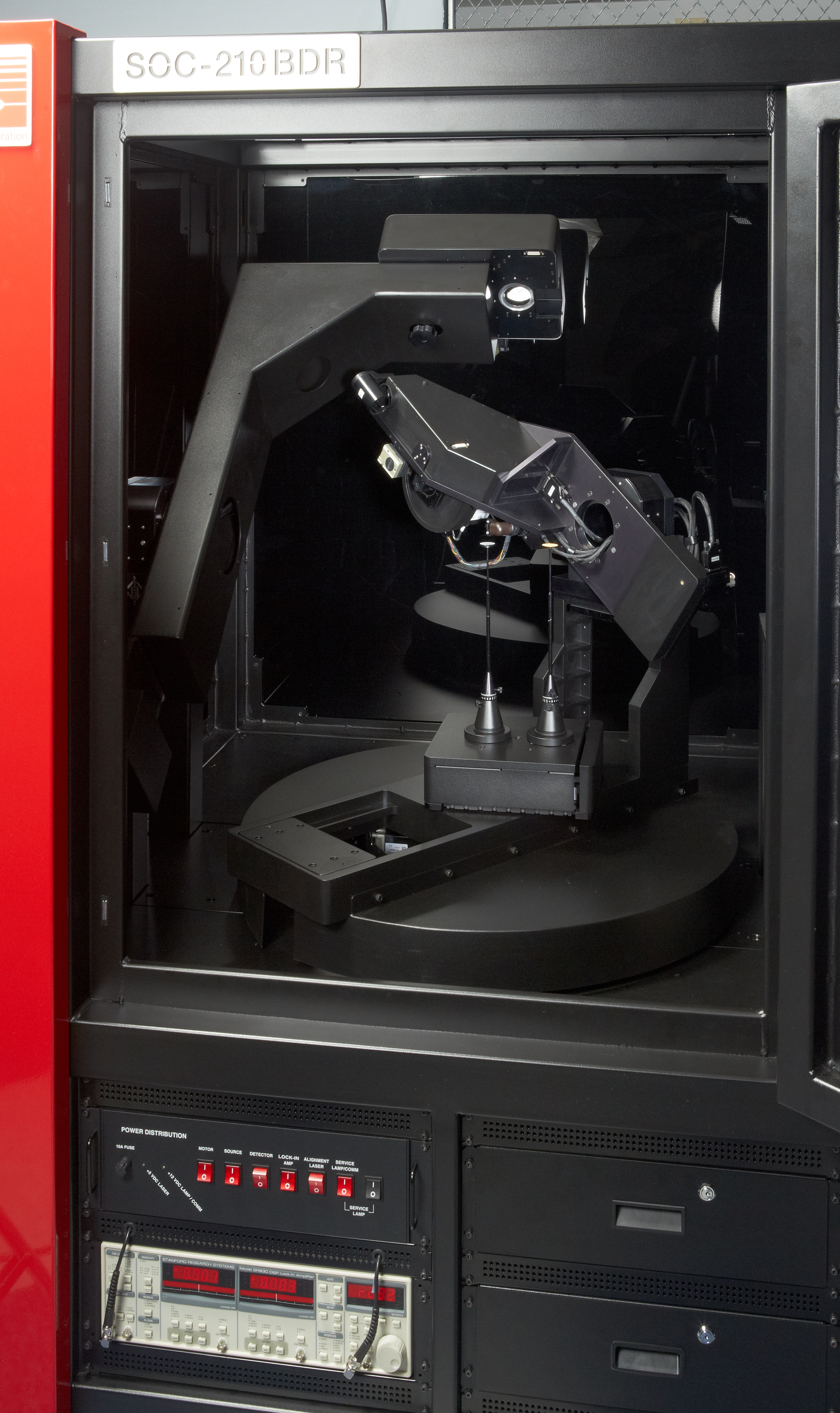
Traditional non-image based lab gonioreflectomer with goniometric arms for positioning the light source and detector. Depicts sample and calibration coupon stages on moveable platform.

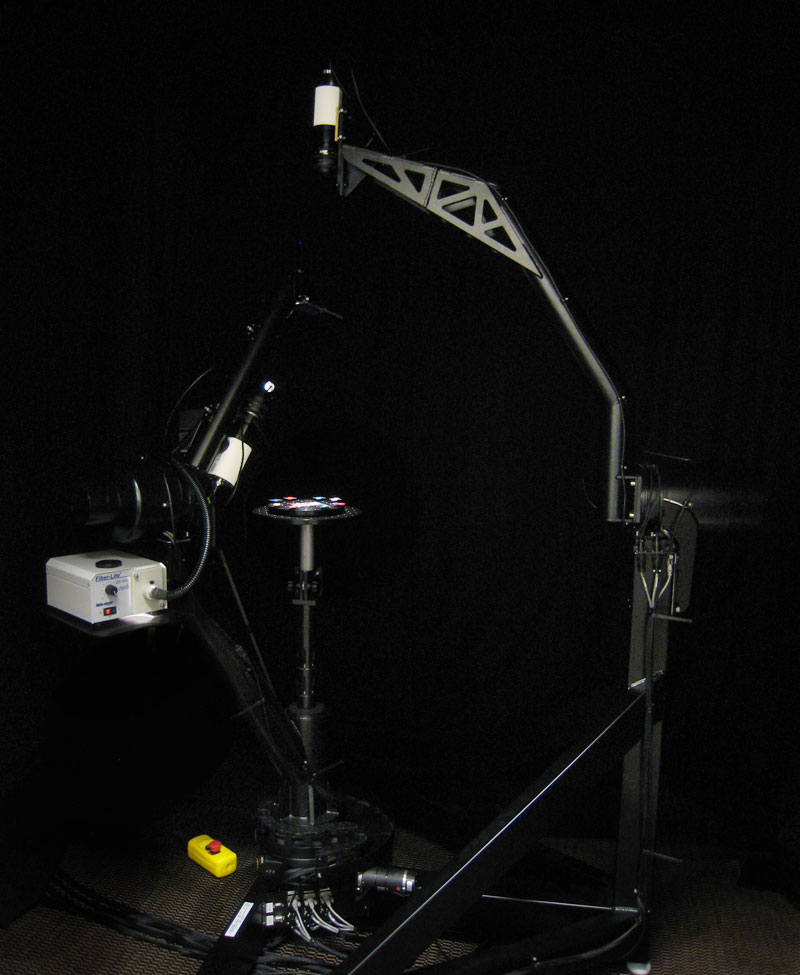
The University of Virginia spherical gantry, an example of a modern image-based gonioreflectometer

A gonioreflectometer is a device for measuring a bidirectional reflectance distribution function (BRDF).

The device consists of a light source illuminating the material to be measured and a sensor that captures light reflected from that material. The light source should be able to illuminate and the sensor should be able to capture data from a hemisphere around the target. The hemispherical rotation dimensions of the sensor and light source are the four dimensions of the BRDF. The 'gonio' part of the word refers to the device's ability to measure at different angles.

Several similar devices have been built and used to capture data for similar functions. Traditional gonioreflectometers sample illumination and viewing angles sequentially, so measurements can be slow, whereas image-based systems use a camera to capture many reflection directions in one measurement and thereby reduce acquisition time. Most of these devices use a camera instead of the light intensity-measuring sensor to capture a two-dimensional sample of the target. Examples include:

- a spatial gonioreflectometer for capturing the SBRDF (McAllister, 2002).
- a camera gantry for capturing the light field (Levoy and Hanrahan, 1996).
- an unnamed device for capturing the bidirectional texture function (Dana et al., 1999).
