= Bidirectional scattering distribution function =

Mathematical function

The definition of the bidirectional scattering distribution function (BSDF) is not well standardized. The term was probably introduced in 1980 by Bartell, Dereniak, and Wolfe. Most often it is used to name the general mathematical function which describes the way in which the light is scattered by a surface. However, in practice, this phenomenon is usually split into the reflected and transmitted components, which are then treated separately as the bidirectional reflectance distribution function (BRDF) and bidirectional transmittance distribution function (BTDF) respectively.

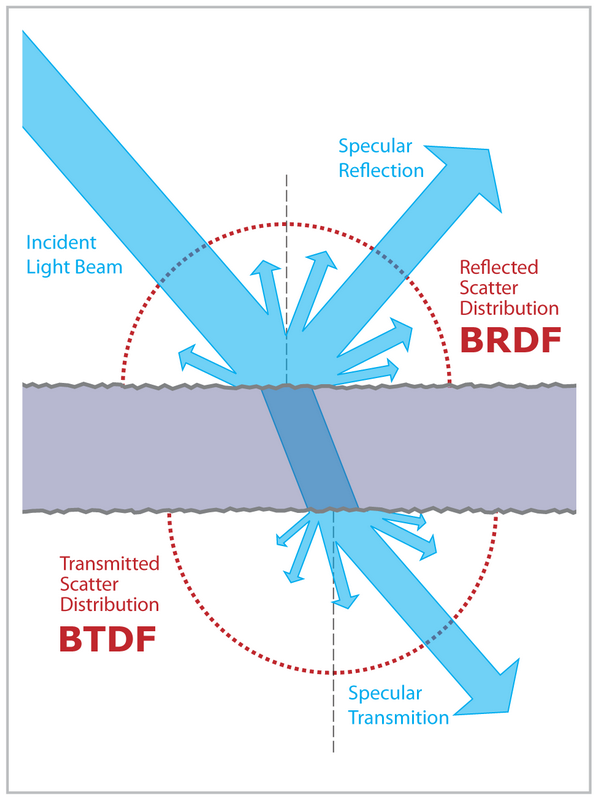
BSDF: BRDF + BTDF

- BSDF is a superset and the generalization of the BRDF and BTDF. The concept behind all BxDF functions could be described as a black box with the inputs being any two angles, one for incoming (incident) ray and the second one for the outgoing (reflected or transmitted) ray at a given point of the surface. The output of this black box is the value defining the ratio between the incoming and the outgoing light energy for the given couple of angles. The content of the black box may be a mathematical formula which more or less accurately tries to model and approximate the actual surface behavior or an algorithm which produces the output based on discrete samples of measured data. This implies that the function is 4(+1)-dimensional (4 values for 2 3D angles + 1 optional for wavelength of the light), which means that it cannot be simply represented by 2D and not even by a 3D graph. Each 2D or 3D graph, sometimes seen in the literature, shows only a slice of the function.
- Some tend to use the term BSDF simply as a category name covering the whole family of BxDF functions.
- The term BSDF is sometimes used in a slightly different context, for the function describing the amount of the scatter (not scattered light), simply as a function of the incident light angle. An example to illustrate this context: for perfectly lambertian surface the BSDF (angle)=const. This approach is used for instance to verify the output quality by the manufacturers of the glossy surfaces.
- Another recent usage of the term BSDF can be seen in some 3D packages, when vendors use it as a 'smart' category to encompass the simple well known cg algorithms like Phong, Blinn–Phong etc.
- Acquisition of the BSDF over the human face in 2000 by Debevec et al. was one of the last key breakthroughs on the way to fully virtual cinematography with its ultra-photorealistic human image synthesis. The team was the first in the world to isolate the subsurface scattering component (a specialized case of BTDF) using the simplest light stage, consisting on moveable light source, moveable high-res digital camera, 2 polarizers in a few positions and really simple algorithms on a modest computer. The team utilized the existing scientific knowledge that light that is reflected and scattered from the air-to-oil layer retains its polarization while light that travels within the skin loses its polarization. The subsurface scattering component can be simulated as a steady high-scatter glow of light from within the models, without which the skin does not look realistic. ESC Entertainment, a company set up by Warner Brothers Pictures specially to do the visual effects / virtual cinematography system for The Matrix Reloaded and The Matrix Revolutions isolated the parameters for an approximate analytical BRDF which consisted of Lambertian diffusion component and a modified specular Phong component with a Fresnel type of effect.

== Overview of the BxDF functions ==
BRDF vs. BSSRDF

- BRDF (Bidirectional reflectance distribution function) is a simplified BSSRDF, assuming that light enters and leaves at the same point (see the image on the right).
- BTDF (Bidirectional transmittance distribution function) is similar to BRDF but for the opposite side of the surface. (see the top image).
- BDF (Bidirectional distribution function) is collectively defined by BRDF and BTDF.
- BSDF (Bidirectional scattering distribution function) is formally defined as the sum of the BRDF and the BTDF. In modern rendering standards such as Open Shading Language (OSL), BSDFs are represented as symbolic closures to allow the renderer to perform deferred evaluation and optimized sampling techniques like multiple importance sampling.
- BSSRDF (Bidirectional scattering-surface reflectance distribution function or Bidirectional surface scattering RDF) describes the relation between outgoing radiance and the incident flux, including the phenomena like subsurface scattering (SSS). The BSSRDF describes how light is transported between any two rays that hit a surface.
- BSSTDF (Bidirectional scattering-surface transmittance distribution function) is like BTDF but with subsurface scattering.
- BSSDF (Bidirectional scattering-surface distribution function) is collectively defined by BSSTDF and BSSRDF.

== See also ==
- BRDF
- Radiometry
- Reflectance
- Radiance
- BTF
