= Debevec =

Debevec is a Slovenian surname. Notable people with the surname include:

- Paul Debevec (fl. 1996), American computer graphics professional
- Rajmond Debevec (born 1963), Slovenian sport shooter
