= Creature performer =

A creature performer can be:

- a costumed performer
- an actor engaged in motion-capture acting
