= ELITE SHARP CTT =

The Emergent Leader Immersive Training Environment Sexual Harassment/Assault Response and Prevention Command Team Trainer, or ELITE SHARP CTT, is a laptop-based training software application for junior officers as well as battalion and brigade commanders in the U.S. military to learn how to work together with Sexual Assault Response Coordinators (SARCs) and Victim Advocates (VAs) to properly approach sexual assault or harassment complaint in their ranks. It is an interactive avatar-based simulator designed in the format of a video game in order to more effectively convey the lessons and replace the traditional slide show-based training. The ELITE SHARP CTT program was developed by the Institute for Creative Technologies at the University of Southern California and the U.S. Army Research Laboratory (ARL).

== Development ==
The ELITE SHARP CTT software was based on the existing Emergent Leader Immersive Training Environment (ELITE) Lite platform, an avatar-based counseling tool that has helped train junior officers and non-commissioned officers on how to deal with situations ranging from disagreements with superiors to sexual harassment. Unlike the ELITE Lite program, which was aimed at the platoon level and below, the ELITE-SHARP CTT program was designed for command teams. According to the researchers, the development process took about 12 months and involved interviews with commanders who had sexual harassment and assault incidents occur within their commands in the past.

On September 10, 2015, a beta test was conducted by the U.S. Army SHARP Program Office, the U.S. Army SHARP Academy, the Army Research Lab, the Institute for Creative Technologies, and the National Simulation Center as part of the software validation process. The ELITE SHARP CTT program received final approval for use as an official Army training tool on March 21, 2016, and was released in April 2016.

== Use ==
The ELITE SHARP CTT program utilized a virtual human instructor to teach key concepts and provided animated vignettes that portray examples of good and bad responses to sexual harassment incidents. Practice exercises were also provided where the trainee could test what they learned in example scenarios.

The training application consisted of 13 scenarios that were presented in three phases: Up-front Instruction, Practice Environment, and an After Action Review. The practice exercises featured scenarios where the commander must interact with both the victim and the alleged perpetrator of the sexual harassment. The ELITE SHARP CTT program also included examples on how to address male sexual assault survivors.

According to the 2016 U.S. Army Annual Report on Sexual Assault, company commanders and first sergeants demonstrated a 15% point increase in their knowledge on handling Sexual Harassment/Assault Response and Prevention incidents after completing the ELITE SHARP CTT training. While soldiers can download the training program for free on a website, efforts have been made to implement the game as part of the curriculum for schools in the U.S. Army.
