= FaceApp =

Photo manipulation application

- App icon seen on iOS and Android
- Developer: FaceApp Technology Limited
- Release: December 31, 2016; 9 years ago
- Written in: Python
- Operating system: iOS, Android
- Type: Image editing
- License: Freemium
- Website: faceapp.com

FaceApp is a photo and video editing application for iOS and Android developed by FaceApp Technology Limited, a company based in Cyprus. The app generates highly realistic transformations of human faces in photographs by using neural networks. The app can transform a face to make it smile, look younger, look older, or change gender.

== History ==
FaceApp was launched on iOS in January 2017 and on Android in February 2017. It was developed by Yaroslav Goncharov, a former executive at Yandex, and created by the Russian company Wireless Lab.

== Features ==
There are multiple options to manipulate the photo uploaded such as editor options of adding an impression, make-up, smiles, hair colors, hairstyles, glasses, age or beards. Filters, lens blur and backgrounds along with overlays, tattoos, and vignettes are also a part of the app.

The gender change transformations of FaceApp have attracted particular interest from the LGBT and transgender communities, due to their ability to realistically simulate the appearance of a person as the opposite gender.

== Criticism ==
In 2017, FaceApp faced criticism for a "hot" filter that appeared to lighten users' skin tones, prompting accusations of racial bias. The feature was briefly renamed "spark" before being removed. Founder Yaroslav Goncharov attributed the issue to training data bias and apologized. In August of that year, more criticism arose when it featured "ethnicity filters" depicting "White", "Black", "Asian", and "Indian". The filters were immediately removed from the app.

In 2019, FaceApp faced criticism over its handling of user data, including concerns that it stored users' photos on its servers and could use them for commercial purposes. Founder Yaroslav Goncharov stated that images were processed on cloud servers like Google Cloud Platform and Amazon Web Services, not transferred to Russia, and were temporarily stored only to support editing functions before being deleted. U.S. Senator Chuck Schumer raised concerns about data privacy and called for an FBI investigation.

== See also ==
- Face of the Future
- Deepfake
