= Face of the Future =

2005 website

- Developers: University of St Andrews and Perception Lab
- Release: January 2005; 21 years ago
- Available in: English
- Type: Image editing
- Website: cherry.dcs.aber.ac.uk/fof/index.html

Face of the Future was a project established in 2005 by the University of St Andrews and Perception Lab, funded by the EPSRC. The website contained "Face Transformer", which enables users to transform their face into any ethnicity and age as well as the ability to transform their face into a painting (in the style of either Sandro Botticelli or Amedeo Modigliani). This process is achieved by combining the user's photograph with an average face.

In 2012, Smithsonian Magazine recommended the site to those interested in "seeing how [they would] look in the future". In 2016, The Ringer referred to the site as "a predecessor to those wildly popular weight- and aging-booth apps."

== See also ==
- FaceApp
