= Bidirectional texture function =

Bidirectional texture function (BTF) is a 6-dimensional function depending on planar texture coordinates (x,y) as well as on view and illumination spherical angles. In practice this function is obtained as a set of several thousand color images of material sample taken during different camera and light positions.

The BTF is a representation of the appearance of texture as a function of viewing and illumination direction. It is an image-based representation, since the geometry of the surface is unknown and not measured. BTF is typically captured by imaging the surface at a sampling of the hemisphere of possible viewing and illumination directions. BTF measurements are collections of images. The term BTF was first introduced in and similar terms have since been introduced including BSSRDF and SBRDF (spatial BRDF). SBRDF has a very similar definition to BTF, i.e. BTF is also a spatially varying BRDF.

To cope with a massive BTF data with high redundancy, many compression methods were proposed.

Application of the BTF is in photorealistic material rendering of objects in virtual reality systems and for visual scene analysis, e.g., recognition of complex real-world materials using bidirectional feature histograms or 3D textons.

Biomedical and biometric applications of the BTF include recognition of skin texture.

== See also ==
- BSDF == BRDF + BTDF, a 4+1 dimensional function of the scattering distribution from a single point/pixel/vertex.
- Columbia Utrecht Reflectance and Texture Database
- BTF Database Bonn and Measurement Lab
- CVPR 2010 BTF Modeling Tutorial
- BTFbase - BTF compression based on a multi-level vector quantization (free BTF shader)
- UTIA BTF Database - a new source of publicly available bidirectional texture function measurements
