= Motion-capture acting =

Acting for motion capture

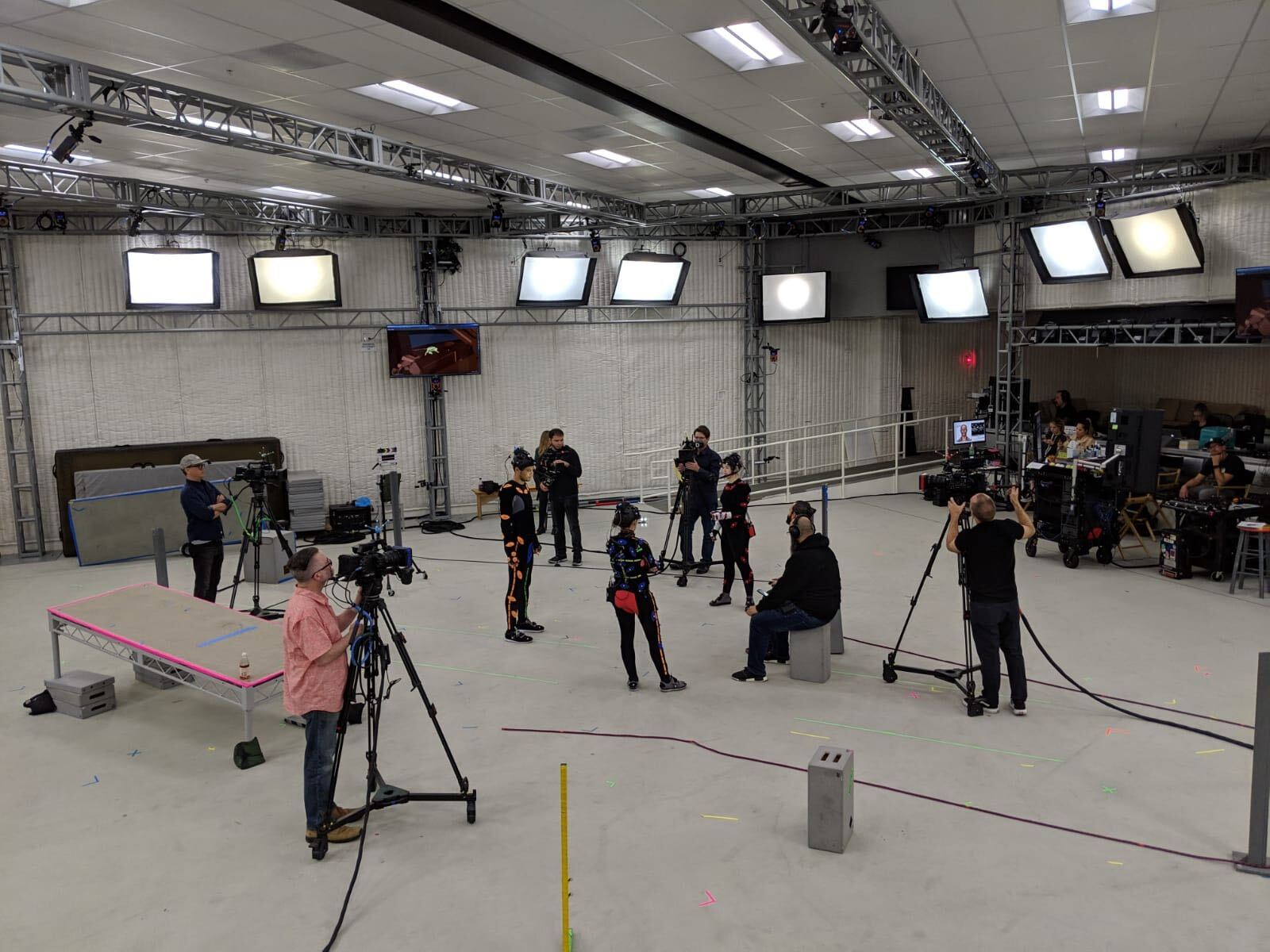
Motion capture recording for The Last of Us Part II

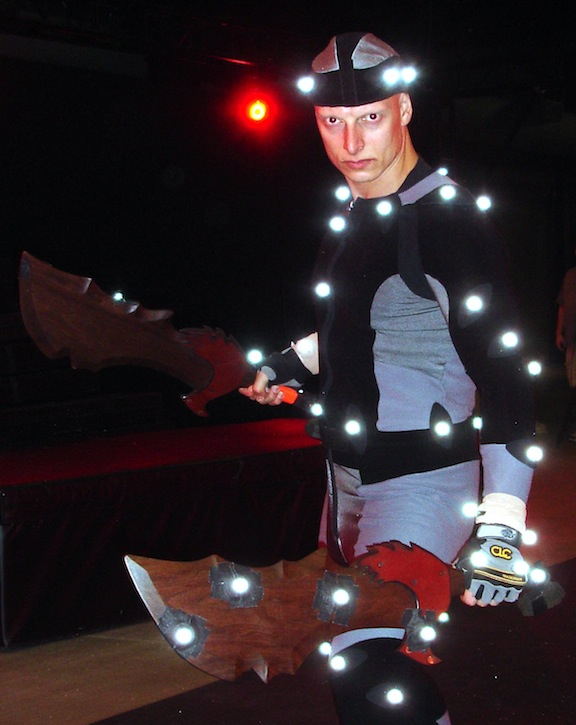
Joseph Gatt wearing the Mo-Cap suit for Kratos during production of God of War II and III in 2010

Motion-capture acting, also called performance-capture acting and often abbreviated as mo-cap or P-cap, is a type of acting in which an actor wears markers or sensors on a skintight bodysuit or directly on the skin. Several cameras from different angles record the actor's movements simultaneously, recording the three-dimensional position of the sensors without recording the rest of the actor. Sampling is done many times each second, aided by advances in computer technology. The resulting database of 3D points permits a filmmaker or video game creator to create a digital character and place them in an entirely new setting.

== History ==
The first virtual actor animated by motion-capture was produced in 1993 by Didier Pourcel and his team at Gribouille. It involved "cloning" the body and face of French comedian Richard Bohringer, and then animating it with still-nascent motion-capture tools.

== Description ==
This type of acting is seen as a growth area, with predictions that there will be more work in the future for actors. Some talent agents represent motion-capture actors in addition to their live-action actors. Motion-capture acting can be difficult work, often involving unusual movements not found in human locomotion, and other unusual performance requirements. For example, one actor was "placed in a tiny booth, had dots placed all over his face that captured his movements, and had to sit perfectly still". As it is a new type of acting work, one report suggested that actors wishing to break into this line of work should go to acting class and become experts in skills such as gunplay, sword fighting, hand-to-hand combat, dancing, running, jumping, gymnastics, and general body movement.

== Notable practitioners ==
Numerous sources identify English actor Andy Serkis as the "king of motion-capture acting" based on his portrayal of digital characters in films such as King Kong, The Lord of the Rings, and Planet of the Apes. According to one report, the first use of motion-capture acting for a video game was for the 2007 PlayStation 3 release Heavenly Sword, which starred Serkis. In an August 2011 interview, Serkis said, "Performance-capture technology is really the only way that we could bring these characters to life. It's the way that Gollum was brought to life, and King Kong, and the Naʼvi in Avatar and so on [...] it's really another way of capturing an actor's performance. That's all it is, digital make-up."

== Disputes ==
There have been battles within the entertainment industry about recognition for motion-capture actors. The Alliance of Motion Picture and Television Producers does not consider motion-capture acting to be the same type of work as live-action acting, which means that motion-capture actors are often paid less. The actors' union SAG-AFTRA has lobbied the industry for better employment terms and conditions for motion-capture actors, arguing that the work should be included in standard labor contracts. As of 2020, major award ceremonies still have no motion-capture acting category.

== See also ==
- Human image synthesis
- Motion capture
