= Paul Debevec =

American computer graphics professional

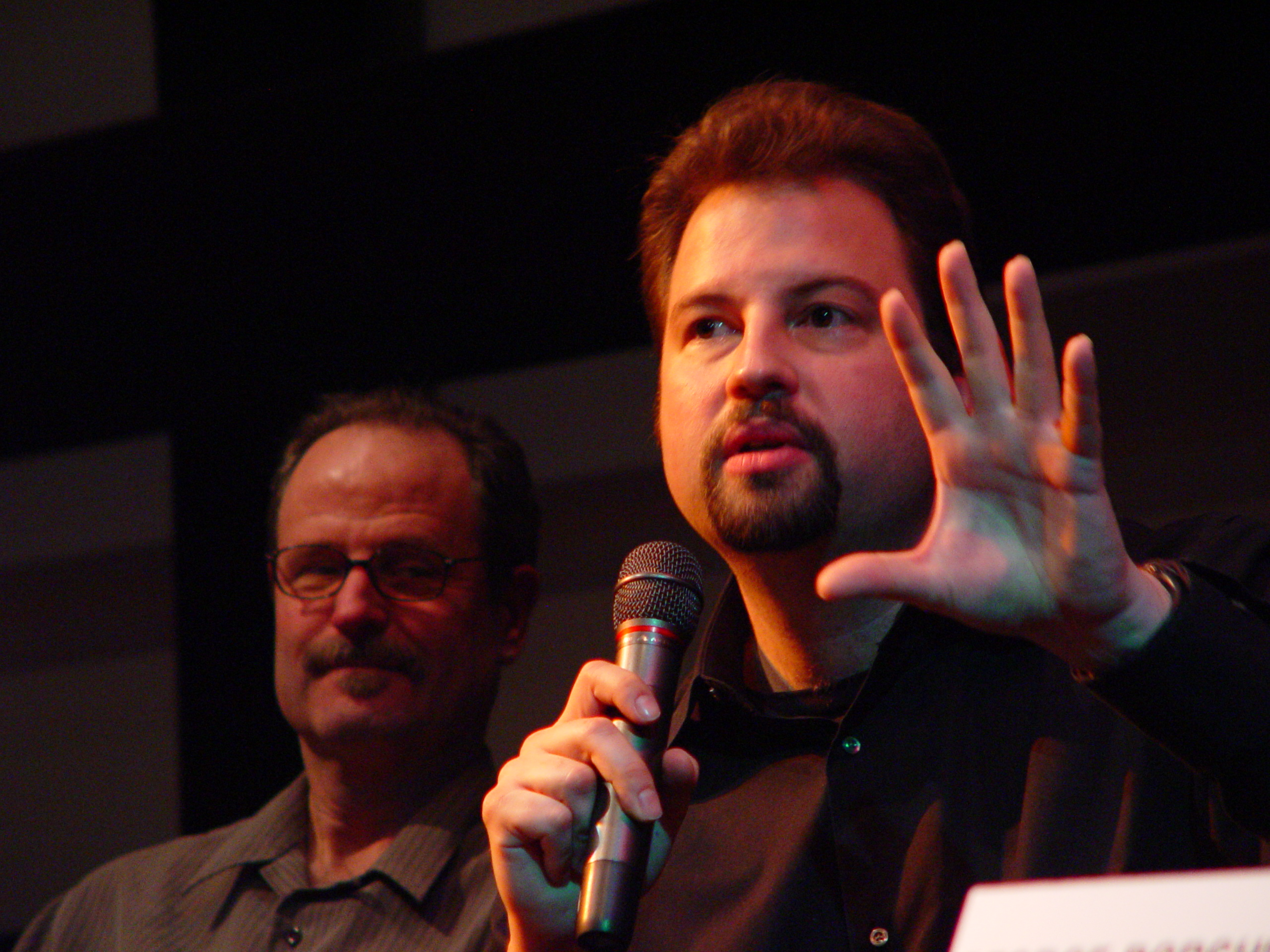
Paul Debevec in 2008

Paul Ernest Debevec is a researcher in computer graphics at the University of Southern California's Institute for Creative Technologies. He is best known for his work in finding, capturing and synthesizing the bidirectional scattering distribution function utilizing the light stages his research team constructed to find and capture the reflectance field over the human face, high-dynamic-range imaging and image-based modeling and rendering.

Debevec received his undergraduate degree in mathematics and engineering from the University of Michigan, and a Ph.D. in computer science from University of California, Berkeley in 1996; his thesis research was in photogrammetry, or the recovery of the 3D shape of an object from a collection of still photographs taken from various angles. In 1997 he and a team of students produced The Campanile Movie (1997), a virtual flyby of UC Berkeley's Campanile tower. Debevec's more recent research has included methods for recording real-world illumination for use in computer graphics; a number of novel inventions for recording ambient and incident light have resulted from the work of Debevec and his team, including the light stage, of which five or more versions have been constructed, each an evolutionary improvement over the previous.

Techniques based on Debevec's work have been used in several major motion pictures, including The Matrix (1999), The Matrix Reloaded and The Matrix Revolutions (2003) Spider-Man 2 (2004), King Kong (2005), Superman Returns (2006), Spider-Man 3 (2007), and Avatar (2009).

In addition Debevec and his team produced several short films that have premiered at SIGGRAPH's annual Electronic Theater, including Fiat Lux (1999) and The Parthenon (2004).

Debevec, along with Tim Hawkins, John Monos and Mark Sagar, was awarded a 2010 Scientific and Engineering Award from the Academy of Motion Picture Arts and Sciences for the design and engineering of the Light Stage capture devices and the image-based facial rendering system developed for character relighting in motion pictures.

In 2002, he was named to the MIT Technology Review TR100 as one of the top 100 innovators in the world under the age of 35.

Some of his later work he presented to the SIGGRAPH convention in 2008 and 2013, Digital Emily in association with Image Metrics and Digital Ira in association with Activision respectively. Digital Emily shown in 2008 was a pre-computed simulation meanwhile Digital Ira ran in real-time in 2013 and is fairly realistic looking even in real-time animation.

In June 2016, Debevec joined Google's Virtual Reality group.

In 2024 Debevec and Corridor Digital recreated the sodium vapor process, which had fallen out of use due to the difficulty in creating the necessary beam splitter.

In 2026 Debevec was awarded a 2026 Scientific and Technical Award from the Academy of Motion Picture Arts and Sciences for his pioneering work in high dynamic range, image-based lighting techniques.
