= Subsurface scattering =

Mechanism of light transport

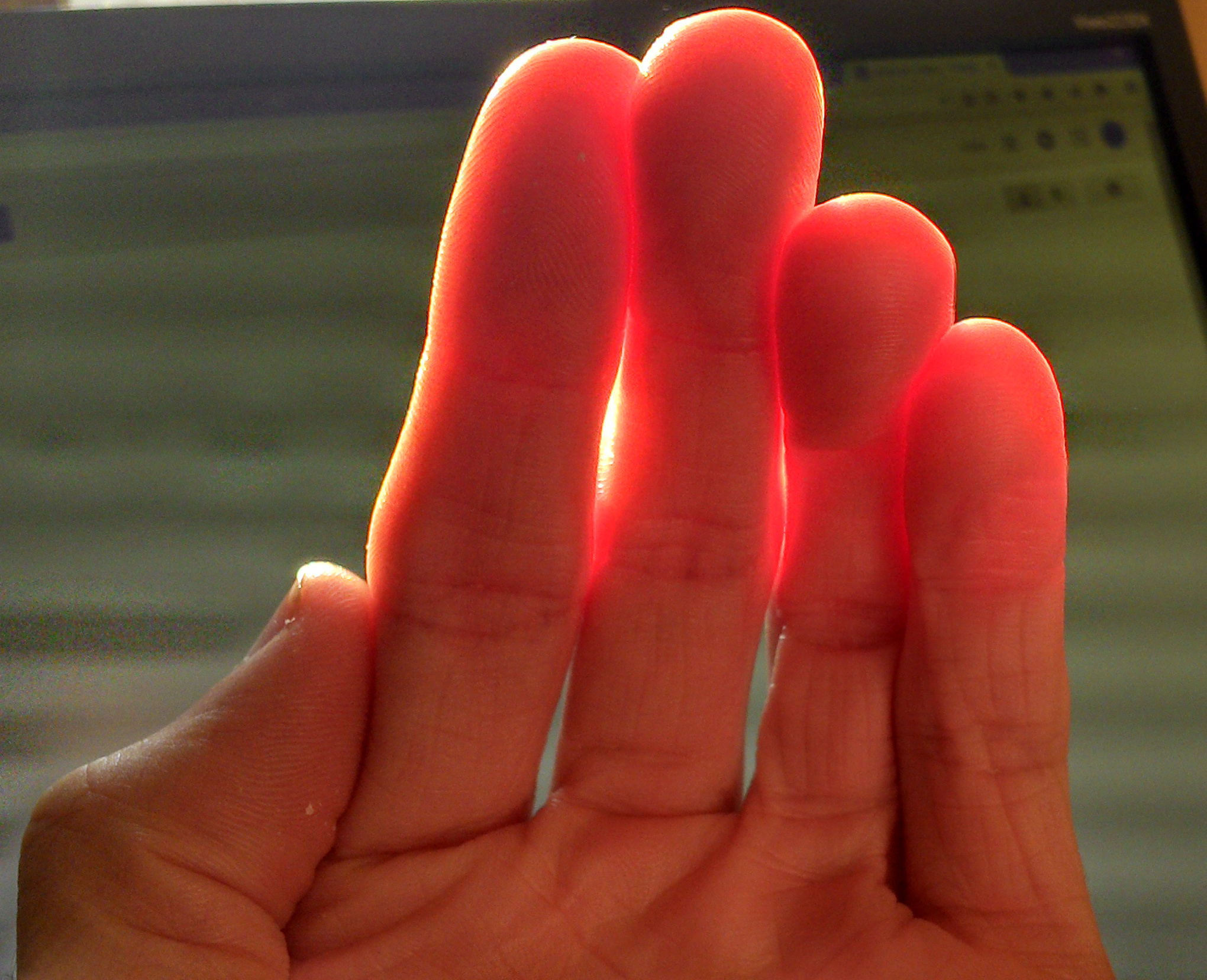
Real-world subsurface scattering of light in a photograph of a human hand

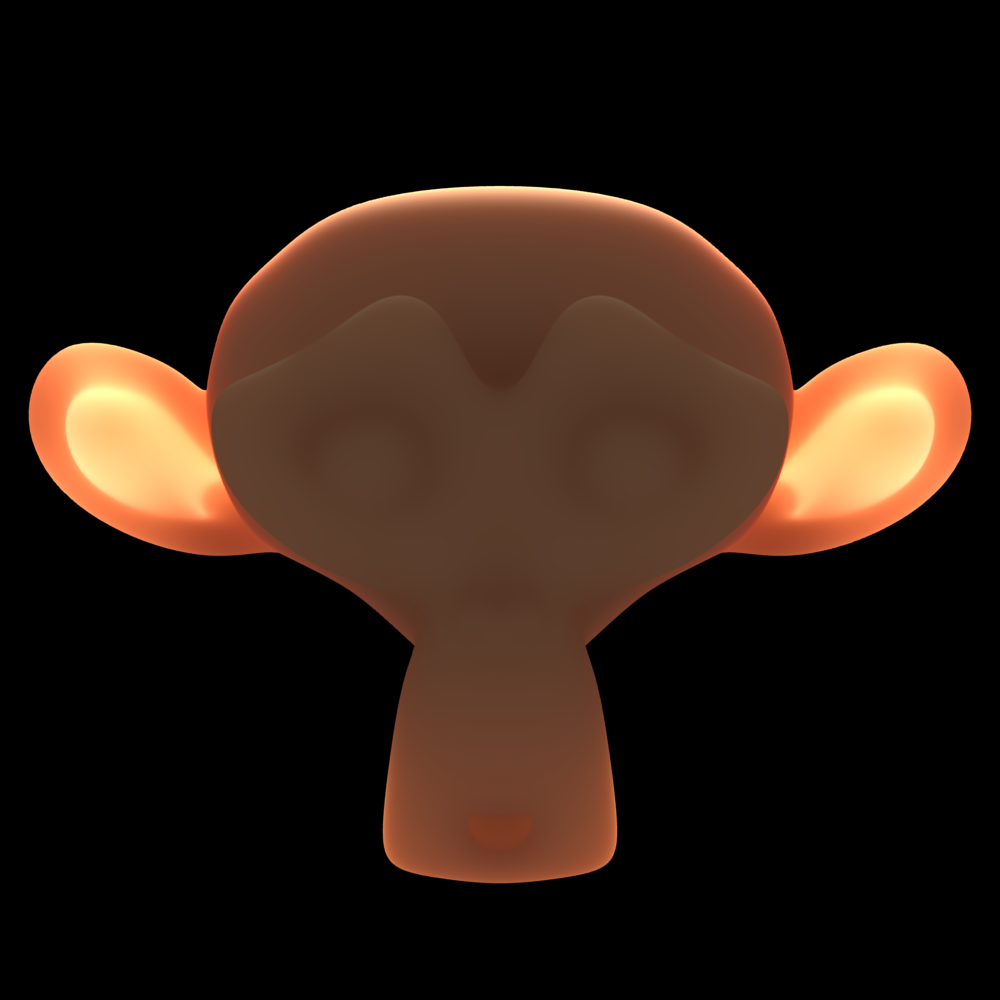
Computer-generated subsurface scattering in Blender

In optics, subsurface scattering or subsurface light transport is the traveling of light through the surface of translucent object, the subsequent scattering of light caused by interactions with the material, and exiting the surface potentially at a different point. Light generally penetrates the surface and gets scattered a number of times at irregular angles inside the material before passing back out of the material at a different angle than it would have had if it had been reflected directly off the surface.

Subsurface scattering is important for realistic 3D computer graphics, being necessary for the rendering of materials such as marble, skin, leaves, wax and milk. If subsurface scattering is not implemented, the material may look unnatural, like plastic or metal.

== Rendering techniques ==
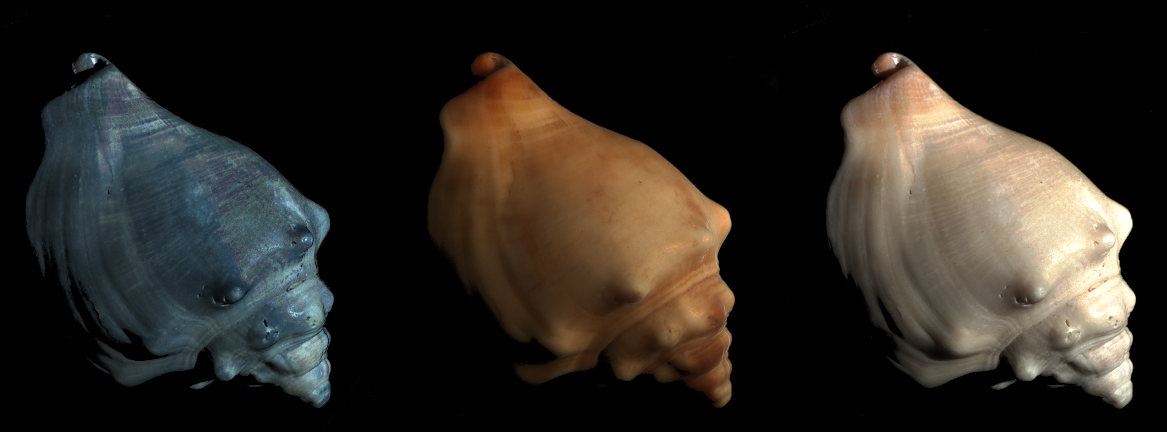
Direct surface scattering (left) plus subsurface scattering (middle) creates the final image on the right.

To improve rendering efficiency, many real-time computer graphics algorithms only compute the reflectance at the surface of an object. In reality, many materials are slightly translucent: light enters the surface; is absorbed, scattered and re-emitted – potentially at a different point. Skin is a good case in point; only about 6% of reflectance is direct, 94% is from subsurface scattering. An inherent property of semitransparent materials is absorption. The further through the material light travels, the greater the proportion absorbed. To simulate this effect, a measure of the distance the light has traveled through the material must be obtained.

=== Random walk SSS ===
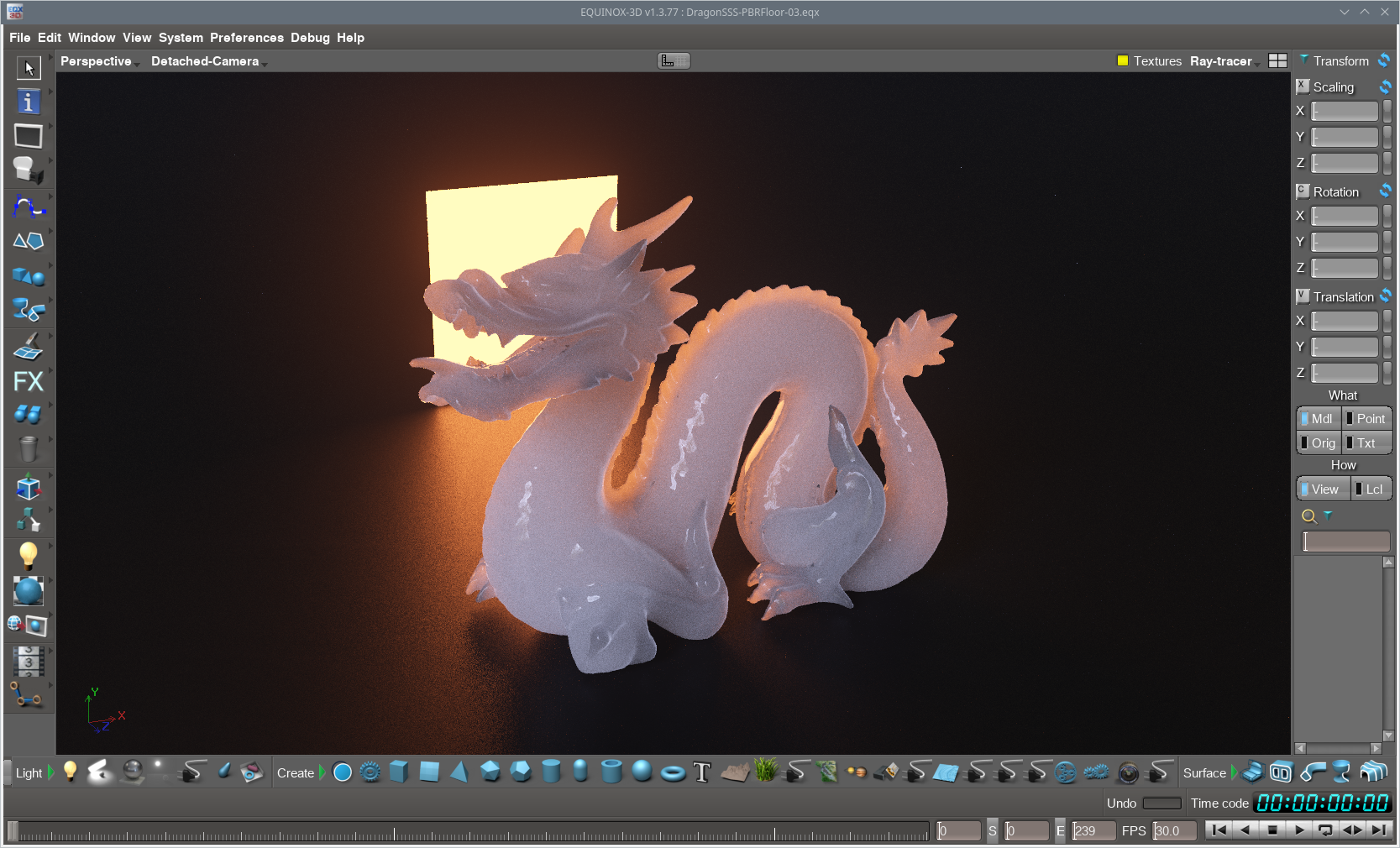
Random walk SSS in Equinox3D's path-tracer

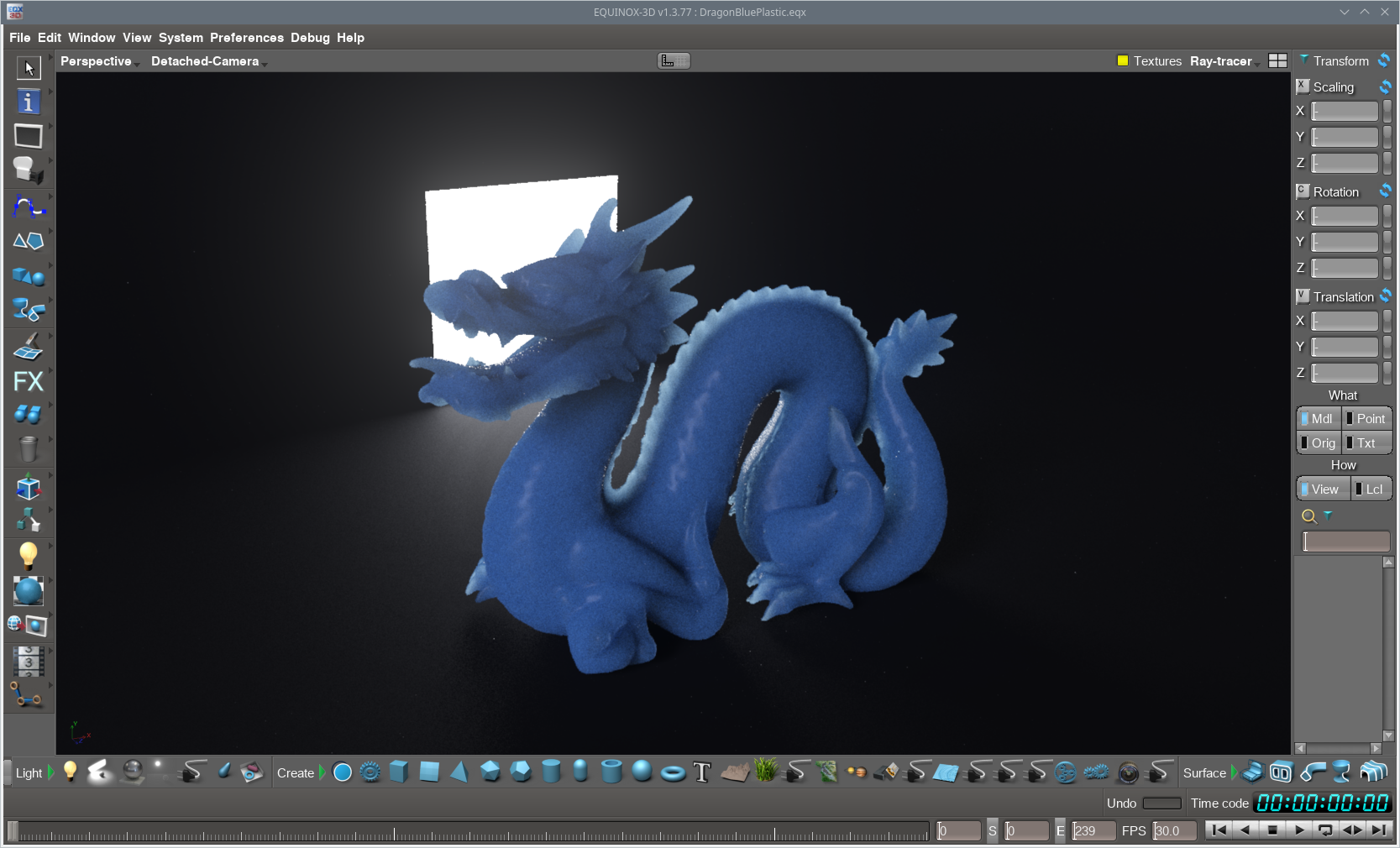
Random walk SSS + PBR surface reflection in Equinox3D's path-tracer

Published by Pixar, this technique is considered the state of the art, usually integrated into a path-tracing renderer. It essentially simulates what happens to real photons by tracing a light path into the material, generating new paths using a lambertian distribution around the inverted normal, then picking new directions at multiple steps to scatter the light path further, hence the name "random walk". Isotropic scattering is simulated by picking random directions evenly along a sphere. Anisotropic scattering is simulated usually by using the Henyey-Greenstein phase function. For example, human skin has anisotropic scattering. Optical depth / absorption is applied based on the length of the paths, using the Beer-Lambert law. Paths may be terminated inside the material when they reach a contribution minimum threshold or a maximum iteration count. When a path (ray) hits the surface again, it is used for gathering radiance from the scene, weighted by a lambertian distribution, as in a traditional path-tracer. This technique is intuitive and is robust against thin geometry.

=== Depth Map based SSS ===
Depth estimation using depth maps

One method of estimating this distance is to use depth maps, in a manner similar to shadow mapping. The scene is rendered from the light's point of view into a depth map, so that the distance to the nearest surface is stored. The depth map is then projected onto it using standard projective texture mapping and the scene re-rendered. In this pass, when shading a given point, the distance from the light at the point the ray entered the surface can be obtained by a simple texture lookup. By subtracting this value from the point the ray exited the object we can gather an estimate of the distance the light has traveled through the object.

The measure of distance obtained by this method can be used in several ways. One such way is to use it to index directly into an artist created 1D texture that falls off exponentially with distance. This approach, combined with other more traditional lighting models, allows the creation of different materials such as marble, jade and wax.

Potentially, problems can arise if models are not convex, but depth peeling can be used to avoid the issue. Similarly, depth peeling can be used to account for varying densities beneath the surface, such as bone or muscle, to give a more accurate scattering model.

As can be seen in the image of the wax head to the right, light isn't diffused when passing through object using this technique; back features are clearly shown. One solution to this is to take multiple samples at different points on surface of the depth map. Alternatively, a different approach to approximation can be used, known as texture-space diffusion.

=== Texture space diffusion ===
As noted at the start of the section, one of the more obvious effects of subsurface scattering is a general blurring of the diffuse lighting. Rather than arbitrarily modifying the diffuse function, diffusion can be more accurately modeled by simulating it in texture space. This technique was pioneered in rendering faces in The Matrix Reloaded, but is also used in the realm of real-time rendering techniques.

The method unwraps the mesh of an object using a vertex shader, first calculating the lighting based on the original vertex coordinates. The vertices are then remapped using the UV texture coordinates as the screen position of the vertex, suitable transformed from the [0, 1] range of texture coordinates to the [-1, 1] range of normalized device coordinates. By lighting the unwrapped mesh in this manner, we obtain a 2D image representing the lighting on the object, which can then be processed and reapplied to the model as a light map. To simulate diffusion, the light map texture can simply be blurred. Rendering the lighting to a lower-resolution texture in itself provides a certain amount of blurring. The amount of blurring required to accurately model subsurface scattering in skin is still under active research, but performing only a single blur poorly models the true effects. To emulate the wavelength dependent nature of diffusion, the samples used during the (Gaussian) blur can be weighted by channel. This is somewhat of an artistic process. For human skin, the broadest scattering is in red, then green, and blue has very little scattering.

A major benefit of this method is its independence of screen resolution; shading is performed only once per texel in the texture map, rather than for every pixel on the object. An obvious requirement is thus that the object have a good UV mapping, in that each point on the texture must map to only one point of the object. Additionally, the use of texture space diffusion provides one of the several factors that contribute to soft shadows, alleviating one cause of the realism deficiency of shadow mapping.

== See also ==
- Bidirectional scattering distribution function
