= Image Metrics =

American company providing facial animation software for the visual effects industries

- Industry: Computer animation
- Founded: 2000; 26 years ago
- Founder: Gareth Edwards; Kevin Walker; Alan Brett
- Website: www.image-metrics.com

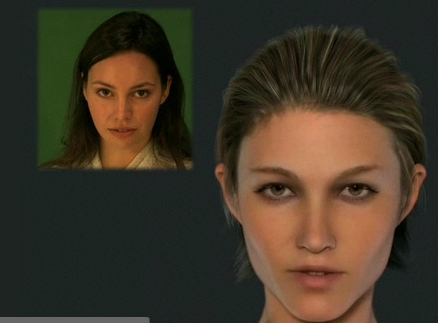
An actress driving the facial performance of a 3D avatar

Image Metrics is a 3D facial animation and Virtual Try-on company headquartered in El Segundo, with offices in Las Vegas, and research facilities in Manchester. Image Metrics are the makers of the Live Driver and Portable You SDKs for software developers and are providers of facial animation software and services to the visual effects industries.

== About ==
The Image Metrics proprietary facial animation system is a Markerless motion capture method in which an actor's performance is filmed and a 3D animated model is generated directly from the raw images. The process uses pre-existing or newly recorded video of an actor's facial performance shot with a video or High definition camera. All detail seen in the recorded video is then analyzed and mapped onto a computer-generated 3D model, including the detailed movements of teeth, tongue, lips and eyes.

The Image Metrics animation process captures facial details like eye movement, lip and tongue synching, subtle expressions and skin textures that can be compromised in the use of traditional motion capture methods. Advanced mapping technology allows Image Metrics to deliver facial animation results up to five times faster than motion capture methods and ten times faster than key frame animation (although this figure is subjective, since Keyframe Animation can be used to produce very different results.)

== History ==
Image Metrics was founded in 2000 in Manchester by Gareth Edwards, Kevin Walker and Alan Brett. The Image Metrics office in Santa Monica was opened six years later.

The Image Metrics performance capture animation process was developed over the past seven years by an in-house team of physicists, programmers and animators. Since its inception, Image Metrics facial animation technology has been applied in over 40 video games, movies and commercials worldwide. In 2006, The New York Times heralded Image Metrics' techniques as "technology that captures the soul".

Image Metrics technology was also used to animate the deceased actor Richard Burton for a computer-generated encore performance. The company provided the modeling and facial animation for a photo-realistic, 11-foot 3D hologram of the late Burton for the Live on Stage! production of "Jeff Wayne's Musical Version of The War of The Worlds." Image Metrics animated a Richard Burton in his mid 30s to recreate his role as journalist George Herbert. Image Metrics completed a total of 23 minutes of facial animation synchronized to the original audio recording of the international star of stage and screen.

== Credits ==
Image Metrics has created facial animation for feature films including The Wolfman (2010), Meet Dave (2008), Foodfight! (2012) and Harry Potter and the Order of the Phoenix (2007). In addition to its work with feature films, Image Metrics has created facial animation for a number of popular video games including Red Dead Redemption, Devil May Cry 4, SOCOM U.S. Navy SEALs: Combined Assault, SOCOM U.S. Navy SEALs: Fireteam Bravo 2, Bully, Grand Theft Auto: Vice City Stories, Syphon Filter: Dark Mirror, 24: The Game, Call of Duty 2, Grand Theft Auto: Liberty City Stories, The Warriors, Midnight Club 3: DUB Edition, Metal Gear Solid 3: Snake Eater, The Getaway: Black Monday, Grand Theft Auto: San Andreas, and Grand Theft Auto IV. They are also an integral component of Sony's SOEmote feature which debuted in the successful MMORPG, Everquest 2 in August 2012.
