= Crowd =

Group who have gathered for a common purpose or intent

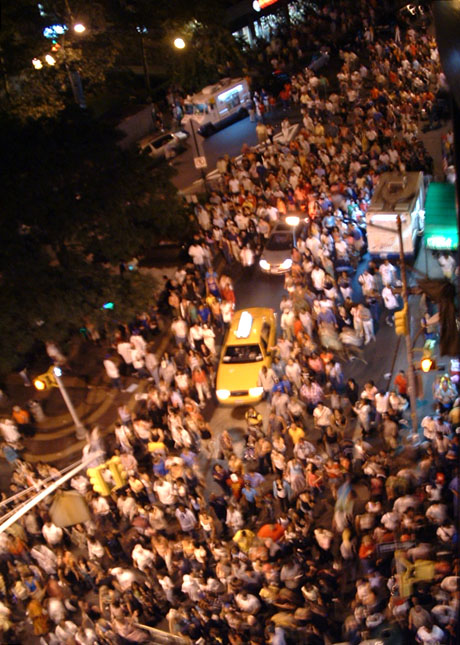
A crowd of people returning from a show of fireworks spills into the street stopping traffic at the intersection of Fulton Street and Gold Street in Lower Manhattan

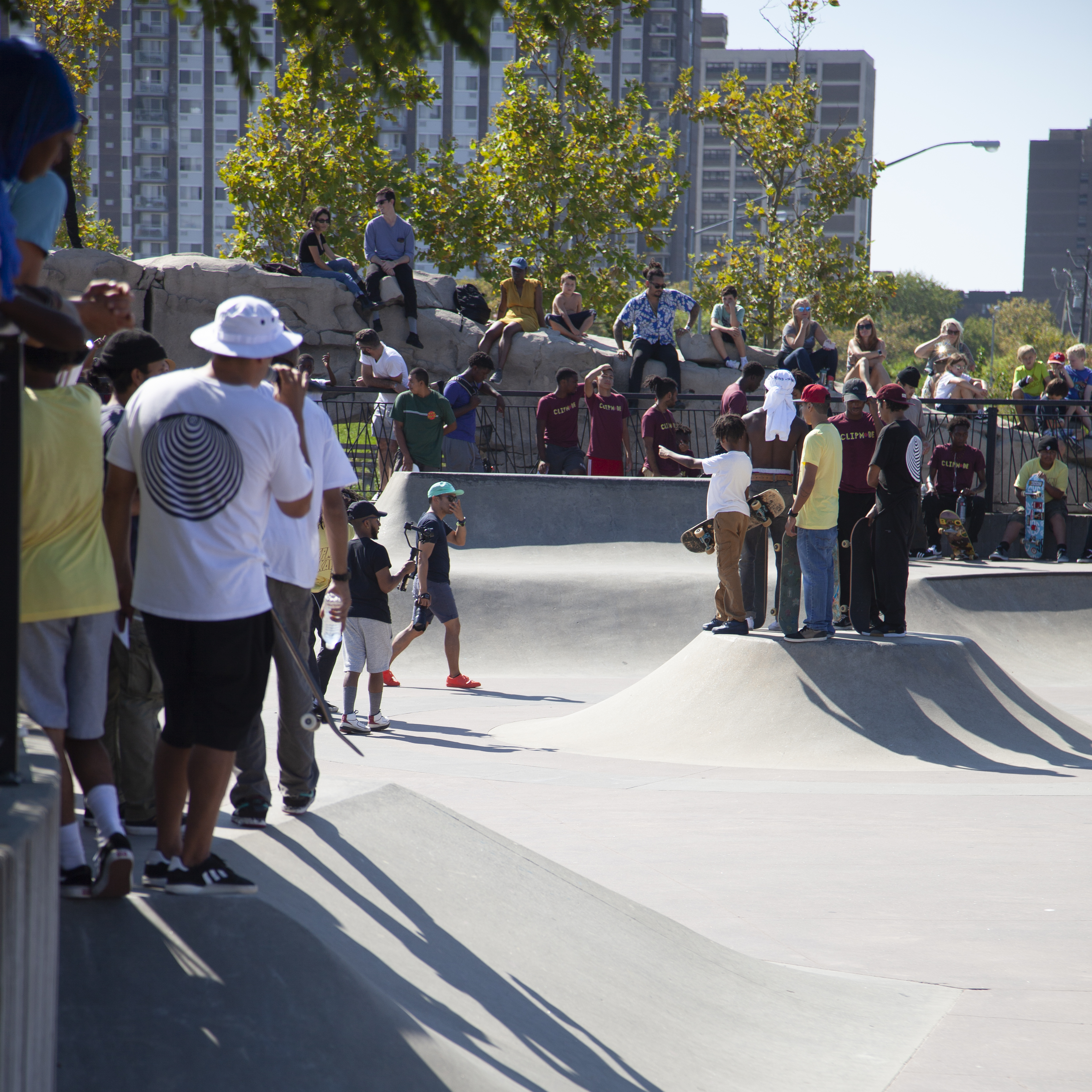
A crowd watches the Battle of the Beach 2 – Far Rockaway Skatepark – September, 2019

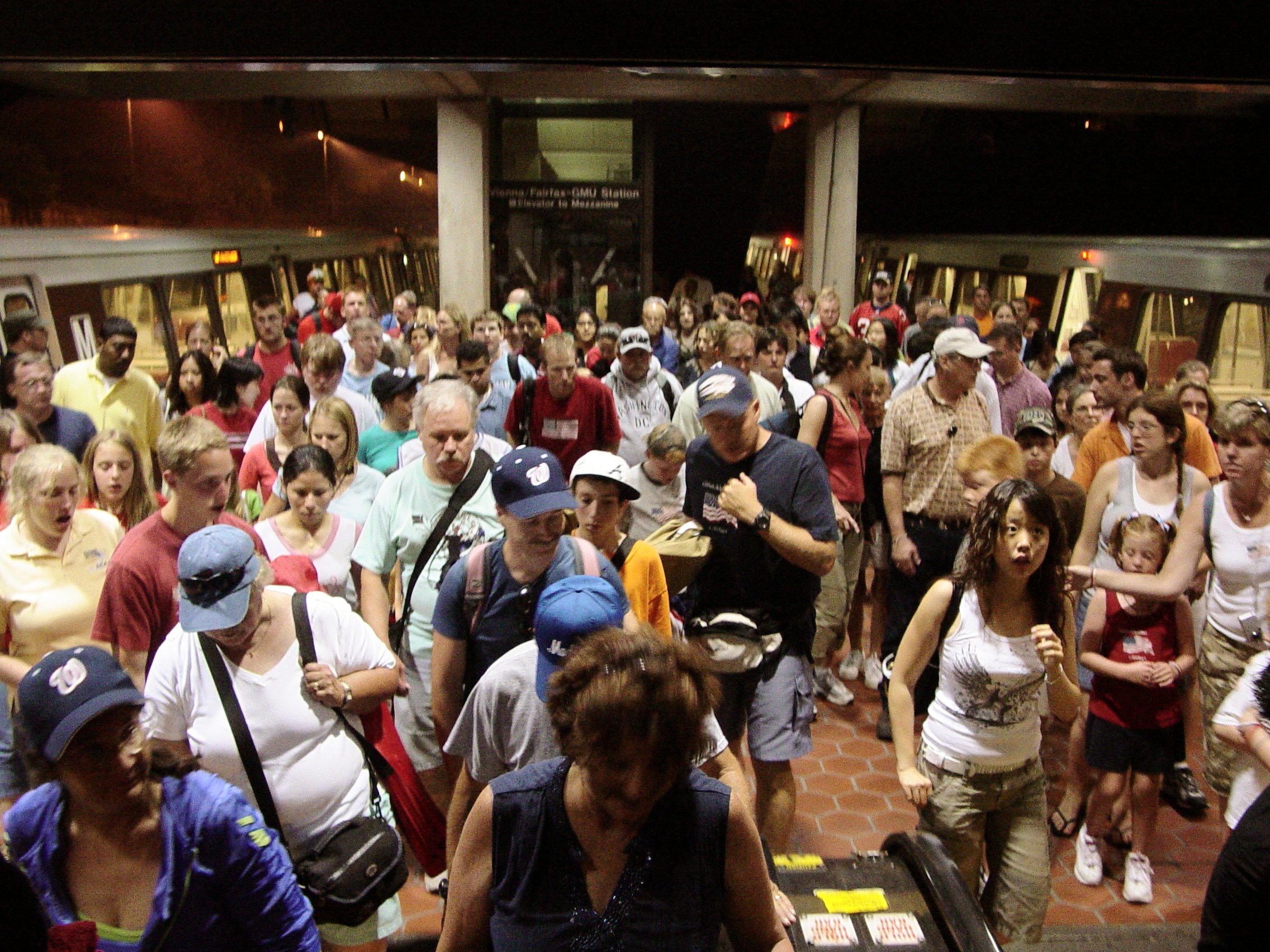
A crowd leaves the Vienna station on the Washington Metro in 2006.

A crowd is a group of people that have gathered for a common purpose or intent. Examples are a demonstration, a sports event, or a looting (classified in sociology as an acting crowd). A crowd may also simply be made up of many people going about their business in a busy area.

The term "the crowd" may sometimes refer to the lower orders of people in general.

== Terminology ==
The term "crowd" is sometimes defined in contrast to other group nouns for collections of humans or animals, such as aggregation, audience, group, mass, mob, populous, public, rabble and throng. Opinion researcher Vincent Price compares masses and crowds, saying that "Crowds are defined by their shared emotional experiences, but masses are defined by their interpersonal isolation."

In human sociology, the term "mobbed" simply means "extremely crowded", as in a busy mall or shop. "Mobbing", carries a more negative connotation associated with bullying. In animal behaviour, mobbing is an anti-predatory technique where "prey surround the predator or intruder" and engage in harassment. Mobbing behaviour is often seen in birds.

== Social aspects ==
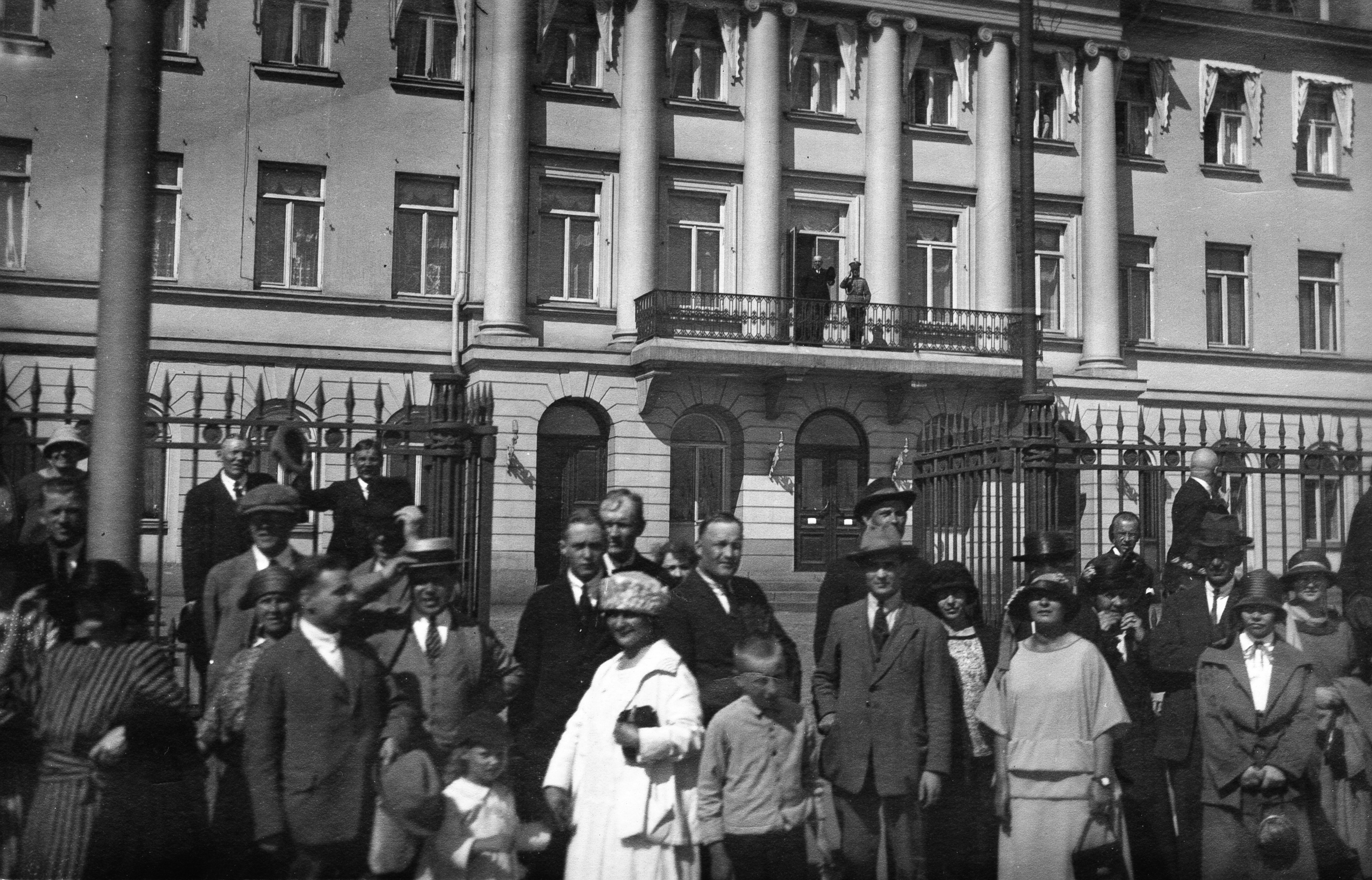
A crowd in front of the Presidential Palace on July 21, 1924, in Helsinki, Finland

Social aspects are concerned with the formation, management and control of crowds, both from the point of view of individuals and groups. Often crowd control is designed to persuade a crowd to align with a particular view (e.g., political rallies), or to contain groups to prevent damage or mob behaviour. Politically organised crowd control is usually conducted by law enforcement but on some occasions military forces are used for particularly large or dangerous crowds.

According to Gustave Le Bon, an individual partaking in a crowd adopts certain characteristics such as a decreased ability to think consciously, a predominance of unconscious motives, succumbing easily to suggestion or contagion of feelings and ideas in a similar direction, and tend towards immediately bringing suggestions to action. In his view, most crowds are impulsive, irritable, incapable of reasoning, lack judgement and are fueled by an exaggeration of sentiments. Crowds typically follow an individual or an individual that supports an idea or belief that they deem superior or credible. Le Bon identified two classes of leaders: those that are energetic and have a strength of will and those whose strength of will is enduring, though the latter is thought to be the most impactful. His ideology suggests that the leader should affirm, repeat the affirmation, and foster contagion within the crowd in order to have lasting effects.

== Psychological aspects ==
Psychological aspects are concerned with the psychology of the crowd as a group and the psychology of those who allow their will and emotions to be informed by the crowd (both discussed more comprehensively under crowd psychology).

Many studies on crowds have given insights on how crowds respond to different situations. One 2009 report highlighted many observable behaviors of crowds, including evidence that crowds are able to make united decisions regarding their direction and speed of movement, even if only a few of its members have the information required to make such decisions. The degree to which informed members can affect the crowd depends on their position within the group, with those in the crowd's core likely to have a greater influence.

Generally, researchers in crowd psychology have focused on the negative aspects of crowds, but not all crowds are volatile or negative in nature. For example, in the beginning of the socialist movement crowds were asked to put on their Sunday dress and march silently down the street. A more-modern example involves the sit-ins during the Civil Rights Movement. Crowds can reflect and challenge the held ideologies of their sociocultural environment. They can also serve integrative social functions, creating temporary communities.

=== Types of crowd ===
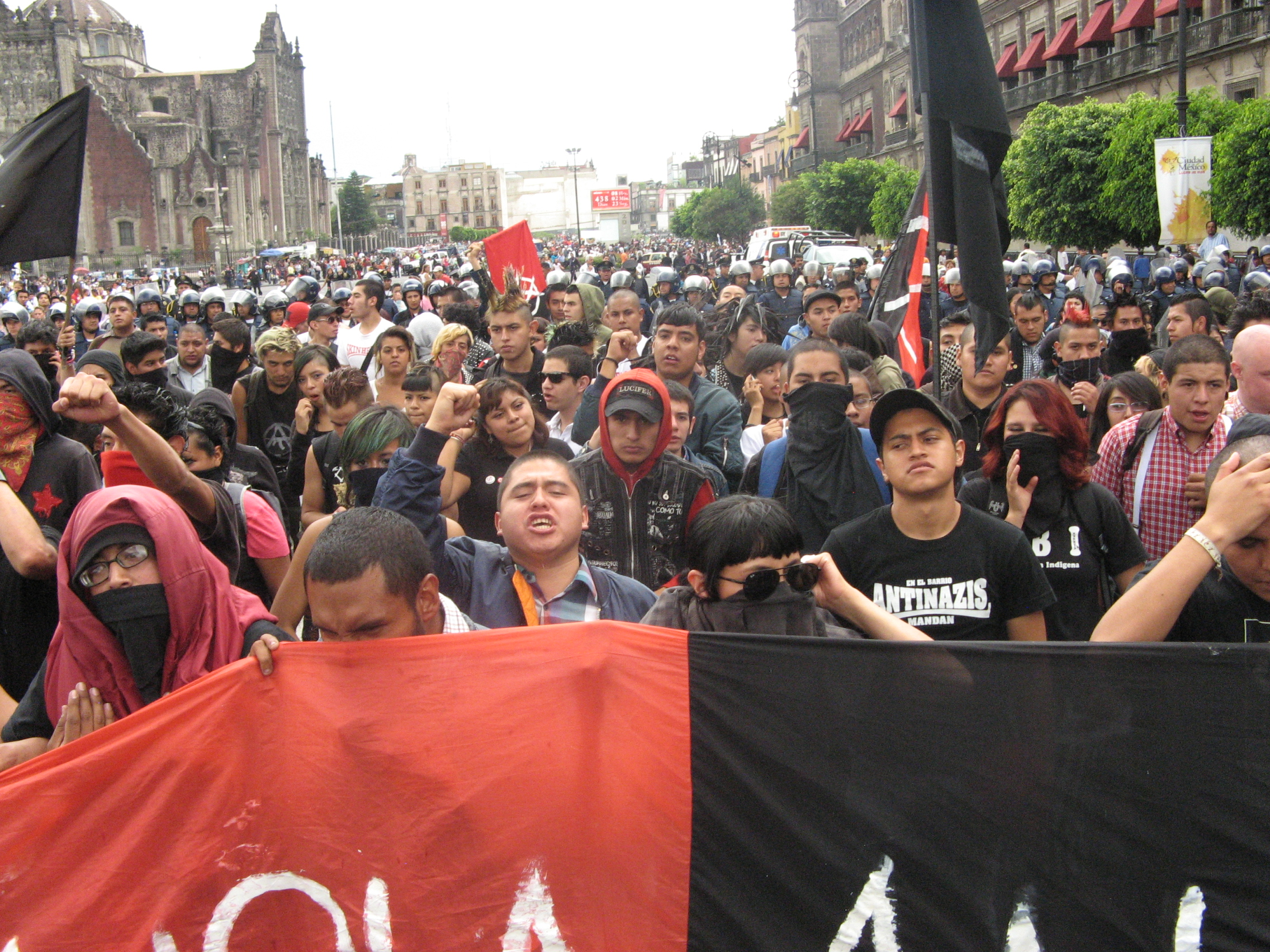
Anarchist crowd during a protest in Mexico City

There is limited research into the types of crowd and crowd membership and there is no consensus as to the classification of types of crowds. Two recent scholars, Momboisse (1967) and Berlonghi (1995) focused upon purpose of existence to differentiate among crowds. Momboisse developed a system of four types: casual, conventional, expressive, and aggressive. Berlonghi classified crowds as spectator, demonstrator, or escaping, to correlate to the purpose for gathering.

Other sociologists distinguished four types of crowds: casual, conventional, expressive, and acting. Casual crowds consists of people aggregated in the same place informally such as a coffee shop. There are also conventional crowds or those that come together for a regularly scheduled event including a church service and expressive crowds that meet to partake in an emotional time together like a wedding or funeral. Lastly, there are acting crowds that join to achieve a common goal or action, which could involve participating in a protest or riot.

Crowds can be active (mobs) or passive (audiences). Active crowds can be further divided into aggressive, escapist, acquisitive, or expressive mobs. Aggressive mobs, which are common in riots, are often violent and outwardly focused. Examples are football riots and the L.A. Riots of 1992. Escapist mobs are characterized by a large number of people trying to get out of a dangerous situation. Incidents involving crowds are often reported by media as the results of panic. However, the scientific literature has explained how panic is a myth which is used to mislead the attention of the public from the real causes of crowd incidents such as crowd crashes. Acquisitive mobs occur when large numbers of people are fighting for limited resources. An expressive mob is any other large group of people gathering for an active purpose. Civil disobedience, rock concerts, and religious revivals all fall under this category.

== Movement dynamics ==
Studies have shown that human crowds move in ways that resemble fluid, and can be modeled by such methods as particle simulation and statistical physics. Similar observations have been made for car traffic and the movement of ant aggregations.

=== Crowd analysis ===
Crowd analysis is the practice of interpreting data on the natural movement of groups or objects. Masses of bodies, particularly humans, are the subjects of these crowd tracking analyses that include how a particular crowd moves and when a movement pattern changes. Researchers use the data to predict future crowd movement, crowd density, and plan responses to potential events such as those that require evacuation routes. Applications of crowd analysis can range from video game crowd simulation to security and surveillance.

== See also ==
- Agent-based social simulation
- Collective animal behavior
- Community
- Crowd counting
- Crowd collapses and crushes
- Crowdfunding
- Crowd manipulation
- Crowd simulation
- Crowdsourcing
- Flocking (behavior)
- Group behaviour
- Herd behavior
- Multitude (philosophy)
