= Monaghan (disambiguation) =

Monaghan is a town in County Monaghan, Ireland.

Monaghan, a variant of the Gaelic manacháin, meaning "little monk", may also refer to:

== Places ==
- County Monaghan, a county in Ulster province, in the Republic of Ireland
  - Monaghan (Dáil constituency), a former parliamentary constituency in Ireland spanning the whole of County Monaghan
- Monaghan Township, Pennsylvania, U.S.
- Cavan Monaghan, a township in Peterborough County, Ontario, Canada
- Otonabee–South Monaghan, a township in Peterborough County, Ontario, Canada

== Constituencies ==
- County Monaghan (Parliament of Ireland constituency), until 1800
- Monaghan Borough (Parliament of Ireland constituency), until 1800
- County Monaghan (UK Parliament constituency), 1801–1885
- North Monaghan, 1885–1922
- South Monaghan, 1885–1922
- Monaghan (Dáil constituency), 1921–1977
- Cavan–Monaghan, since 1977

== People ==
- Monaghan (surname), including a list of people with the surname

== Other ==
- Monaghan United F.C., an Irish football (soccer) club
- USS Monaghan, the name of two ships in the US Navy named after John R. Monaghan
  - USS Monaghan (DD-32), a Paulding-class destroyer, which served in World War I
  - USS Monaghan (DD-354), the last Farragut class destroyer built, which served in World War II at Pearl Harbor and the Battle of Midway

== See also ==
- Minihan
- Monahan
- Moynahan
- Moynihan (surname)
