= Golaem Crowd =

3D graphics software

- Developer: Golaem
- Initial release: May 2011; 15 years ago
- Stable release: 8.0.3 / November 3, 2021; 4 years ago
- Written in: C++, MEL, Python
- Operating system: Linux, Windows
- Platform: x64
- Available in: English
- Type: 3D Computer Graphics
- License: Proprietary
- Website: golaem.com/content/product/golaem

Golaem Crowd is a plug-in for Autodesk Maya that simulates controllable character crowds based on independent agents. Golaem, a French-based software company, developed it.

== History ==
- The first public version of the software was presented and released in May 2011 at the 16th annual FMX conference in Stuttgart.
- V1.1 was released in June 2011 with the added support of 3Delight.
- During SIGGRAPH 2011, Golaem and the Academy award-winning post-production studio Mikros Images released Golaem Project, a short film showcasing Golaem Crowd's capabilities.
- V1.2 was released in September 2011. It was the first version to support Chaos Group's V-Ray rendering engine and use Disney's Partio particle cache.
- V1.3 was released in November 2011 and added new character behaviors relying on IK. At the same time, the new pricing was announced, as was the official Golaem Crowd blog.
- V1.5 was released in July 2012.
- V2.0 was released in August 2012 and added a graphical behavior editor and ragdoll physics and formations.
- V2.2 was released in January 2013 and added support for Solid Angle's Arnold rendering engine.
- V3.0 was released in December 2013, adding n-peds support, flock behaviors, and a new previsualization.
- V3.1 was released in February 2014, adding visual debugging and Arnold mtoa 1.x compatibility.
- V4.0 was released in March 2015, adding timeline scrubbing, cache editing, cloth simulation, squash and stretch, and alembic support.

== In production ==
Some examples where Golaem Crowd was used in production includes:

- ALÉSIA, le rêve d'un roi nu,⁣ by Mikros Image (post-production)
- Once Upon a Time, by Zoic Studios
- Nissan Juke commercial, by Mikros Image (post-production)
- Orange Sport Be Prepared commercial,⁣ by Mikros Image (post-production)
- Asterix and Obelix: God Save Britannia,⁣ by Mikros Image (post-production)
- Warm Bodies, by Look Effects
- Nike 'Dare to be Brazilian' commercial, by Framestore
- Game of Thrones, ⁣ by Pixomondo
- Der Medicus,⁣ by Pixomondo
- Sky Sports 'Making Sports Better',⁣ by Framestore
- Hercules, by Milk VFX and Cinesite
- Dracula Untold,⁣ by Framestore and Milk VFX
- Dawn of the Planet of the Zombies and the Giant Killer Planets on Some Serious Acid, a short film by Alf Lovvold
- Woodlawn, by Red Sky Studios
- Guitar Hero Live,⁣ by Framestore and FreeStyleGames
- Norm of the North
- Pirates of the Caribbean: Dead Men Tell No Tales

== Compatible renderers ==
- Pixar's RenderMan
- Chaos Group's V-Ray
- Guerilla Render
- Solid Angle's Arnold
- Mental Ray
- 3Delight
- Redshift

== See also ==
- Crowd simulation
- List of Maya plugins
