= PokéPark (disambiguation) =

PokéPark may refer to:

- PokéPark, a defunct theme park in Japan and Taiwan
- PokéPark Wii: Pikachu's Adventure, a 2009 video game
  - PokéPark 2: Wonders Beyond, a 2011 video game
- PokéPark Kanto, a Pokémon-branded theme park
