= Monaghan (surname) =

- Pronunciation: /ˈmɒnəhən/ MON-ə-hən

Origin
- Origin: Monaghan, Ireland
- Meaning: "a Monk"

Other names
- Variant forms: Monahan, Monagas Monagan

The surname Monaghan (/ˈmɒnəhən/ MON-ə-hən) is a family name originating from the province of Connacht in Ireland. Mostly a last name.

== Origins ==
The surname Monaghan is an anglicization of the Irish surname O'Manacháin. The Irish translation for this name is 'descendant of Manachán', which ultimately translates to "Monk". Other variations include Monahan and Monachan.

Essentially, sometime before the 16th century, the Connacht family derived the name Monahan from the infamous warrior Manachán mentioned by the Four Masters at the year 866. The O'Manacháin clan were chiefs of Ui Briuin na Sionna in the barony of Ballintober, Co. Roscommon, until the year 1249 when they were ousted by the O'Beirnes.

Although they share the same spelling, the surname Monaghan is not related to County Monaghan, Ireland, whose name is derived from the Irish Muineachán. Muineachán (Muinechán) means "a place abounding in little hills" or "little shrubbery" from muine, a shrubbery, with the diminutive affix achán.

The surname is however the source for County Fermanagh, Northern Ireland, which means "Place of the Men of Manachán."

== Variations ==
Due to the recent standardisation of the English language, many Gaelic surnames transliterated into English have multiple spelling variations. The surname Monahan is a variant of the surname Monaghan.

== Notable Monaghans ==
- Cameron Monaghan (born 1993), American actor
- Carol Monaghan (born 1972), Scottish National Party politician
- Craig Monaghan (born 1957), Scottish politician
- Dominic Monaghan (born 1976), English actor
- E. Jennifer Monaghan (1933–2014), English educator and historian
- Gerry Monaghan (1915–1973), Canadian politician
- Henry P. Monaghan (1934–2025), American legal scholar
- Jack Monaghan (1921–2022), New Zealand amateur wrestler
- James Monaghan (1921–2007), Australian politician
- Jimmy Monaghan (born 1988), Irish musician
- Joel Monaghan (born 1982), Australian rugby league player
- John Monaghan (disambiguation), multiple people
- Jonathan Monaghan (born 1986), American visual artist
- Joseph Monaghan (disambiguation), multiple people
- Katherine Monaghan (born 1980), British actress
- Mary Monahan (1930-2023), American politician
- Michael Monaghan (born 1980), Australian rugby league footballer and coach
- Michael Monaghan (bishop) (1812–1855), Irish clergyman and bishop
- Michelle Monaghan (born 1976), American actress
- Mike Monaghan (1963–2020), Scottish footballer
- Nicola Monaghan, English novelist
- Pat Monaghan, professor
- Patricia Monaghan (1946–2012), American poet, writer, and spiritual activist
- Rinty Monaghan (1918–1984), Irish boxer
- Robert E. Monaghan (1822–1895), American politician from Pennsylvania
- Thomas Monaghan (disambiguation), multiple people
- Úna Monaghan, Irish harpist
- William Monahan (born 1960), American screenwriter and novelist

== Development ==
A census conducted in 1890 of Ireland states that an estimated 4,300 Irish citizens bear the name Monaghan.
