= Behavior authoring =

Behavior authoring is a technique that is widely used in crowd simulations and in simulations and computer games that involve multiple autonomous or non-player characters (NPCs). There has been growing academic and industry interest in the behavioral animation of autonomous actors in virtual worlds. However, it remains a considerable challenge to author complicated interactions between multiple actors in a way that balances automation and control flexibility.

Several varieties of behavior authoring systems have been created.

== The BML Sequencer and Smartbody ==
Behavior Markup Language (BML) is a tool for describing autonomous actor behavior in simulations and computer games. SmartBody is a framework for animation of artificial intelligence conversation agents to provide a more lifelike simulation. Combining both of these concepts, the BML sequencer is a tool to allow artists to create SmartBody compliant BML animation sequences for multiple virtual humans. SmartBody allows for complex behavior realization, synchronizing speech recordings with non-verbal behaviors by using the Behavior Markup Language (BML). However, there remain two problems for using BML and SmartBody to achieve the vision that an artist has for animating the character: the authoring problem and multi-party behavior synchronization. The BML Sequencer addresses both.

== Behavior authoring in real-time strategy games ==
Behavior authoring for computer games consists of first writing the behaviors in a programming language, iteratively refining these behaviors, testing the revisions by executing them, identifying new problems and then refining the behaviors again.
