= List of Maya plugins =

Maya Plugins are extensions for the 3D animation software Autodesk Maya. There are plugins for many different areas such as modeling, animation, and rendering. Some of them also interact with external applications (for instance renderers, game engines, or other software packages).

== Crowd simulation ==
Plugin	Compatibility	Description
Golaem Crowd	2011-2018 (Windows/Linux: 32 & 64-bit)	Simulates complex and controllable characters.
Miarmy	2012/2013 (Windows/Linux/Mac OS X: 64-bit)	Human language/logic decision system controlled AI, PhysX SDK tools, all renderers support.

== Dynamics ==
Plugin	Compatibility	Description
Miarmy	1.18/2016	PhysX character dynamics & RBD emitter.

== Fluid ==
Plugin	Compatibility	Description
Glu3d	7/8.5	Fluid in real time.
RealFlow	7/8.5/2008	Fluid and simulation.

== Import/Export ==
Plugin	Compatibility	Description
Collada	7-2008	Import/export plugin for the Collada format.
OpenGEX	2013–	Export plugin for the Open Game Engine Exchange format.

== Modeling ==
Plugin	Compatibility	Description
Xfrog	2008-2015	Robust Plant/Organic modeling and animation plugin, and 3000 prebuilt procedural and editable plants (XfrogPlants).

== Rendering ==
Plugin	Compatibility	Description
RenderMan for Maya	2018–2020	Photo-realistic rendering by Pixar.
3Delight for Maya	2016–2018	Renderman compliant renderer by DNA Research.
Maxwell Render for Maya	2011–2020	A unbiased raytracing render engine.
V-Ray for Maya	2016–2020	A raytracing render engine.
FurryBall	2011–2018	Real-time GPU renderer.
Octane Render	2017–2020	Real-time GPU-based (exclusively Nvidia CUDA), unbiased, physically based renderer.
Arnold Renderer	2017–2022	An advanced Monte Carlo ray tracing renderer.
Maya Cg Plug-in	4.5 or above	advanced hardware rendering and the Nvidia Cg high level shading language
