= Thomas Monahan =

Thomas Monahan may refer to:

- Thomas S. Monahan (born 1956), president and CEO of CIBC Mellon
- Tom Monahan, president and CEO of DeVry University
- Thom Monahan, American producer, engineer and musician

== See also ==
- Thomas Monaghan (disambiguation)
