= Moynihan =

Family name

Moynihan is a surname of Irish origin.

Recorded in several spellings forms including Moynihan, Monahan, Monaghan, Monaham, Minihane, Minihan, and probably others, this is an Irish surname of great antiquity. It originates from the Irish language Ó Muimhneacháin, which literally translates as "male descendant of the Munsterman" (or "Ní Mhuimhneacháin" for female descendant and "Uí Mhuimhneacháin" for wife of the Munsterman). The surname is most popular in Counties Cork and Kerry, which form part of the province of Munster. The modern spellings are usually Moynihan and Monaghan, the spelling in the 16th century being generally recorded as Minighane, and regarded as the principal surname of West Cork. Michael and Mortimer Moynihan were famous rebels in the late 16th century, and hailed from Skibbereen. Several of the name were famine immigrants into New York City, who embarked from Liverpool on the ship Hampden bound for that port on December 8, 1846. The first recorded spelling of the family name is shown to be that of Teag Ó Muimhneacháin, dated 1659, in the Barony of Tulla, during the reign of Richard Cromwell, Lord Protector, between 1658 and 1660. Throughout the centuries, surnames in every country have continued to "develop" often leading to astonishing variants of the original spelling.

== People ==
- Antony Moynihan, 3rd Baron Moynihan, British hereditary peer
- Bobby Moynihan, American actor, comedian, and writer
- Brandon Moynihan, actor who plays Captain Obvious
- Brian Moynihan, American businessman
- Colin Moynihan, 4th Baron Moynihan, British politician and rower
- Daniel Patrick Moynihan (1927–2003), American politician, sociologist, and diplomat
- Donald P. Moynihan, Irish-American political scientist
- Dean Moynihan, developer of the video game One Chance
- James Michael Moynihan (1932–2017), American prelate of the Roman Catholic Church
- Jesse Moynihan, American artist, composer and director
- Johnny Moynihan, Irish folk singer
- Jon Moynihan, British businessman and venture capitalist
- Maurice Moynihan, Irish economist and civil servant
- Michael Moynihan (author), American author
- Michael Moynihan (Cork politician) (born 1968), Irish Fianna Fáil politician
- Michael Moynihan (Kerry politician) (1917–2001), Irish Labour Party politician
- Michael C. Moynihan, American journalist
- Michael J. Moynihan, American musician and journalist
- P. H. Moynihan, former United States Congressman from Illinois
- Rebecca Moynihan, Irish Labour Party politician
- Robert Moynihan, editor of Inside the Vatican magazine
- Tim Moynihan (1907–1952), American football player and coach
- Timothy Moynihan (1941–2020), American politician

== See also ==
- Minihan
- Monaghan (disambiguation)
- Monahan
- Moynahan
