= Moynahan =

Moynahan is a family name with Irish origin and may refer to:

People

- Bernard Thomas Moynahan Jr. (1918–1999), American federal judge
- Brian Moynahan (1941–2018), English writer
- Bridget Moynahan (born 1971), American model and actress
- Julian Moynahan (1925–2014), American literary critic and novelist
- Mike Moynahan (1856–1899), American baseball player

Science

- 13620 Moynahan, an asteroid
- Moynahan syndrome, a skin condition

== See also ==
- Minihan
- Monaghan (disambiguation)
- Monahan
- Moynihan (surname)
