= Minihan =

Minihan is a family name with Irish origin. Notable people with the surname:

- Gary Minihan (born 1962), retired Australian sprinter
- Jeremiah Francis Minihan (1903–1973), American prelate of the Roman Catholic Church
- John Minihan (photographer), Irish photographer
- John Minihan (politician) (born 1957), Irish politician
- Kenneth Minihan (born 1943), retired USAF Lt. General, former director of the United States National Security Agency and the Defense Intelligence Agency, father of Mike Minihan
- Mike Minihan (born 1967), USAF General, commander of Air Mobility Command, son of Kenneth Minihan
- Sam Minihan (born 1994), English professional footballer

== See also ==
- Monaghan (disambiguation)
- Monahan
- Moynahan
- Moynihan (surname)
