= Michael Moynihan =

Michael Moynihan may refer to:

- Michael C. Moynihan, American journalist, also writing for Swedish-language publications
- Michael J. Moynihan (born 1969), American writer and musician
- Michael Moynihan (author), American writer known for The Coming American Renaissance
- Michael Moynihan (Cork politician) (born 1968), Irish Fianna Fáil Party politician and TD for Cork North-West
- Michael Moynihan (Kerry politician) (1917–2001), former Irish Labour Party TD for Kerry South
- Michael W. Moynihan (c. 1928–1996), American proponent of free trade
