= Massive animation =

Massive animation may refer to:

- Crowd simulation technology for generating crowd-related visual effects for film and television
- MASSIVE (software) (Multiple Agent Simulation System In Virtual Environment), a software package used for generating crowd-related visual effects
