= Monagas (disambiguation) =

Monagas is a state of Venezuela. Monagas may also refer to:

- Monagas (surname), including a list of people with the name
- José Gregorio Monagas Municipality, Anzoátegui State, Venezuela
- José Tadeo Monagas Municipality, Guarico State, Venezuela
- Monagas Sport Club, a Venezuelan football team

== See also ==
- Parque Familiar Julio Enrique Monagas, Puerto Rico
