= SoundRenderer =

green: Listener Node; white: Speaker Nodes

SoundRenderer is a spatialized audio rendering plugin for Maya to simulate 3D-positional audio. It can be used to create a multichannel audiotrack from many mono wav-files positioned in the scene for later synchronization with the rendered video.

The plugin uses the audiofiles set up in the 3d scene and renders them to a variable number of channels (mono, stereo, 5.1 etc.). To simulate a realistic surrounding, it uses several realworld effects:

- distance-delay
- doppler-effect
- air-absorption
- panning

== Nodes ==
There are two different kinds of nodes available. The speaker nodes can be linked to wav-files which are triggered either by a keyframe or an expression, but can also be looped (for constant environmental sounds). The listener node can contain a variable number of speakers and offers a customization of the different effects and their precision.

== Mixer ==
The mixer offers a parallel configuration of the Speakers in the scene without having to find and select them. It also allows to change the triggering mode.

== See also ==
- 3D audio effect
- Maya (software)
- List of Maya plugins
