= Minahan =

Minahan is a variant surname of the Irish Moynihan. Notable people with the surname include:

- Cotton Minahan (1882–1958), American baseball player and track and field athlete
- Daniel Minahan, American television and film director and writer
- Daniel F. Minahan (1877–1947), American politician
- James Minahan (1872–1941), Irish-born Australian politician
- Patrick Minahan (1866–1933), Irish-born Australian politician
- Robert E. Minahan (1858–1935), American mayor
