= Miarmy =

Crowd simulation plugin

- Developer(s): Basefount
- Initial release: June 22, 2011; 13 years ago
- Stable release: 7.5.24 / July 27, 2023; 20 months ago
- Written in: Python, C++, Maya API, PhysX
- Operating system: Windows, Linux, macOS
- Platform: x64
- Available in: English; Chinese
- Type: 3D computer graphics
- License: Proprietary
- Website: www.miarmy.com

Miarmy is a crowd simulation plugin for Autodesk Maya to render scenes consisting of multiple moving individuals or entities. The plugin is developed by Basefount Software, based in Chengdu, China.

== Version differences ==
Miarmy is available in two versions: Express (free) and Professional (paid). Sets of preset.

== See also ==
- Crowd simulation
- List of Maya plugins
