= Monagas (surname) =

The last name Monagas is a Hispanicized version of the Irish surname Monaghan.

== Origins ==
The Monagas family originated in County Monaghan in Ireland, the first use of the last name Monagas was in the 1600s when Irish officials immigrated to the Canary Islands (Spain), to aid Spanish soldiers in defending the new colony from pirates. After Spanish colonies were set up in South America, many of the descendants of Monaghan emigrated from the Canary Islands and settled in the Viceroyalty of New Granada. When Spanish emigration peaked in the late 19th and early 20th centuries, many Monagases moved to Latin America, as a result their descendants can be found throughout South America and the Caribbean, particularly in Venezuela, Cuba and Puerto Rico.

== People ==
Notable people with the surname include:

- José Tadeo Monagas
- José Gregorio Monagas
- José Ruperto Monagas
- Lionel Monagas (1889–1945) – actor

== See also ==
- Monaghan (surname)
