= Golaem =

France-based software developer

- Company type: Société Anonyme
- Founded: Rennes, France (2009)
- Headquarters: Rennes, France
- Number of employees: 11-50
- Website: www.golaem.com

Golaem is a France-based software developer of solutions dedicated to the population of 3D environments using autonomous human-like characters.

Golaem was created in 2009 in Rennes by researchers and engineers from INRIA, a major French research center, leveraging on 15 years of research on the modeling and simulation of human characters.

This company is known for working with major movie studios, TV series and firms for TV commercials. It notably worked for : Asterix and Obelix: God Save Britannia, Hercules, Game of Thrones, Breaking Bad, The Walking Dead, Once Upon a Time, Warm bodies, Orange S.A., Peugeot, Nike, Nissan, Paco Rabanne, Electronic Arts, T-Mobile or Honda

In 2024, Golaem was acquired by Autodesk and the software is being integrated into Autodesk products.

== Products ==
- Golaem Crowd is a crowd simulation Autodesk Maya plugin, it allows 3D artists to populate their scenes with autonomous characters.
