= Glu3d =

Maya3D modelling plugin that simulates fluid effects

Glu3D is a plugin that simulates fluid effects inside the 3dsmax and Maya3D modelling programs.

== Simulation ==
A Vermouth simulation made with Glu3d for 3dsmax.

Glu3d uses SPH, or Smoothed particle hydrodynamics to solve fluid simulations. Adjustments can be made to the collision geometry by modifying the Friction, Adherence, Bounce and Collision GAP values to each object.

== PWrapper ==
PWrapper is a polygonal mesh surface generator that works in conjunction with glu3D particles to generate a mesh surrounding the particles in realtime. This helps to give a liquid behavior to any particle set with no need to wait for inter-particle interaction calculation times.

== Wetmaps ==
A 3dsmax scene, made with Glu3d using Wetmaps.

Glu3d is also able to generate image sequences called Wetmaps that simulate the wet surface of an object. Wetmaps, if enabled, are generated in a per-object basis, which means that every object has its own wetmap sequence, that is created based on the objects UV Mapping
