= Minogue =

Minogue (/mɪˈnoʊɡ/ mih-NOHG) is a surname of Irish origin, which is a reduced anglicized form of name Ó Muineog, meaning "descendant of Muineog", itself a personal name derived from a diminutive of manach ('monk'). Notable people with the surname include:

- Áine Minogue (born 1977), Irish musician
- Craig Minogue (born 1962), Australian convicted murderer
- Dan Minogue (1891–1961), Australian footballer
- Dan Minogue (politician) (1893–1983), Australian politician
- Dannii Minogue (born 1971), Australian singer-songwriter
- John Minogue (born 1959), Irish hurling manager and former player
- Kenneth Minogue (1930–2013), Australian political scientist
- Kylie Minogue (born 1968), Australian singer, songwriter and actress
- Mick Minogue (1936–2024), Irish hurling coach and player
- Mike Minogue (politician) (1923–2008), New Zealand politician
- Mike Minogue (actor), New Zealand actor
- Walter Minogue (1910–1958), Australian rules footballer

== See also ==
- Monahan
- Monologue
