= PokéPark Kanto =

Theme park in Tokyo, Japan

PokéPark KANTO
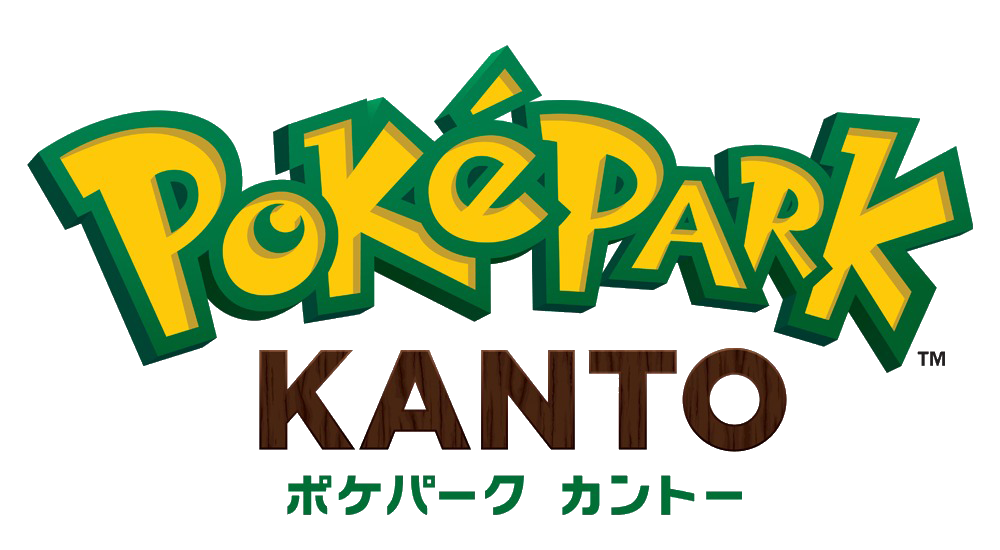
- Logo of PokéPark KANTO
- Interactive map of PokéPark KANTO
- Location: Yomiuriland, Tama-ku, Kawasaki, Kanagawa Prefecture, Japan
- Coordinates: 35°37′33.6″N 139°31′15.6″E
- Opened: February 5, 2026; 9 months ago
- Owner: PokéPark KANTO LLC
- Theme: Pokémon
- Area: 6.4 acres (2.6 ha)

PokéPark KANTO is a Pokémon-branded theme park within Yomiuriland that opened to the public on February 5, 2026. The park is located in the Tama area. The theme park is a collaboration between The Pokémon Company and Yomiuriland. The name was chosen in reference to the fictional Kanto Region, the setting of Pokémon Red, Blue, and Yellow, which was inspired by the real-world Kantō region that Yomiuriland itself is also located in.

It is considered the first permanent outdoor Pokémon attraction. In a press release, PokéPark KANTO is described as "a theme park where visitors can enjoy the Pokémon experience in a lush natural environment through various events". It includes a Pokémon forest you walk through, a central hub known as Sedge Town, rides, and show/parade experiences. The park primarily features text in Japanese with English subtitles on directional or educational signage, with a fictional language used for some inscriptions and logos. Audio or spoken instructions by park personnel are in Japanese.

== History ==
The Pokémon Company has had previous experience with theme parks and crowd analysis in the years after being formed. This includes the 2005 traveling theme park Pokémon the Park and various major annual events, such as the annual Pokémon World Championships.

In addition, The Pokémon Company has had an existing relationship with the Yomiuri group, the creators and owners of Yomiuriland. In 2009, the Yomiuri Shimbun newspaper, one of the Yomiuri group companies, collaborated with The Pokémon Company to create a Pokémon-themed educational children's column named "Let's memorize a proverb encyclopedia with Pokémon!" ("Pokémon to Issho ni Oboeyo! Kotowaza Daihyakka" in its original Japanese). In 2014, a gaming event named "The Pokémon Ryuosen" was held at Yomiuriland. Yomiuriland collaborated with The Pokémon Company to create "Pokémon Wonder", an event that was launched in 2021. In the event, people were given 90 minutes to find handcrafted Pokémon figurines that were hidden in a forest. Pokémon Wonder was open briefly in 2021 and from April to July 2023.

The park and its location was conceptualized by Junichi Masuda upon becoming Chief Creative Fellow at The Pokémon Company in 2022, and a corporation titled "PokéPark KANTO LLC" was formed to operate the facility in 2023.

The park name and concept was officially announced in a press release on July 22nd, 2025 and was slated to open Spring 2026. A Japanese-language video featuring a scale model launched and featured Masuda. On November 10, 2025, the opening date was moved up to February 5, 2026, and an animated video trailer was released.

The company gained criticism after revealing guests unable to physically walk up 110 stairs unassisted and children under 5 would not be allowed to enter a large portion of the park experience (Pokémon Forest). This was cited as due to the terrain for the safety of the guests. In response, the company announced a new lower-priced ticket tier that only includes access to Sedge Town, the portion without these restrictions, which became available for purchase in Summer 2026.

On January 26, 2026, select members of the press were invited to the park grounds before all aspects of the park were operational. Select influencers were invited to film in the park before opening.

== Themed Areas and Entertainment ==
=== PokéPark Entrance Plaza ===
The PokéPark Entrance Plaza serves as the opening area to the park. It features a statue of the three starter Pokémon from Pokémon Red, Blue, and Yellow in the fictional Kanto region (Bulbasaur, Charmander, and Squirtle), Pikachu, and Eevee. A giant Poké Ball statue and an automated display of a puppet play featuring Pokémon can be found in the Plaza.

==== Pokémon Research Lab ====
A building that allows access to either Sedge Town or Pokémon Forest. A replica of a portion of a Pokémon Lab from Pokémon games and media is inside the Pokemon Forest entrance.

==== Pokémon Daisuki Shop ====
The largest merchandise shop in PokéPark KANTO. It features unique merchandise only found at PokéPark KANTO, as well as novelty headbands, omiyage (souvenir snacks and sweets for gifting), plushies, clothing, and more. It can only be accessed via a first-come, first-served limited-time ticket obtained after entering the park.

=== Pokémon Forest ===
The Pokémon Forest is a 1,600 foot trail featuring various natural terrain. Before entering via the Pokémon Research Lab, guests receive a Japanese-language field journal featuring notes and art from the fictional Professor Drobium. Pokémon Forest features direct references to areas in Pokémon Red, Blue, and Yellow, as well as many 1:1 scale Pokémon statues, areas with concentrations of Pokemon types, and audio immersion. Guests can leave the path and gently touch the Pokémon, who appear to be experiencing the forest and interacting with one another, and take photos.

Signs denoting the different portions of the path are in both Japanese and English along the trail.

=== Sedge Town ===
Sedge Town is the fictional town and main hub of PokéPark KANTO. Pokémon are featured as artistic renditions, 1:1 statues, and walk-around characters throughout the town. The town contains a fountain featuring water-type Pokémon, vending machines selling drinks with Pokémon-themed labels, and various other statues.

Stalls in the style of an open-air market sell merchandise or provide game experiences through a central row of Sedge Town.

Ticketed meet and greet experiences are hosted in indoor areas Sedge Condominiums and Pokémon Playhouse.

A parade featuring Pikachu and Eevee mascot characters and performers is viewable.

==== Pokémon Center ====
A replica of the Pokémon Center featured in Pokémon games and media. A statue of Chansey and a theme park performer dressed in the style of Nurse Joy are inside. The performer faithfully recreates an experience of healing Pokémon in their Pokéballs from the game series, then performs the same experience with guests' Pokémon stuffed animals. (Note: Pokemon stuffed animals must meet several restrictions in order to be accepted.)

==== Sedge Gym ====
An indoor stage and meet-and-greet area. It is modeled after a fictional Pokémon gym for electric type Pokémon. Hosts Pika Pika Sparks!, a 25-minute stage show featuring costumed performers, lights, and music.

== Rides ==
PokéPark KANTO features two permanent rides located in Sedge Town.

=== Pika Pika Paradise ===
An aerial carousel-style ride consisting of eight ride vehicles resembling Pikachu. It is decorated with over 30 electric-type Pokémon 1:1 scale statues who are said to be "powering" the vehicle.

=== Vee Vee Voyage ===
A merry-go-round themed around Eevee and its evolutions, which decorate the ride via 1:1 scale statues. Guests may ride bobbing horse-like Pokémon, bobbing seats depicted as floating via balloons, or still seats. Its design includes elements of rides from the golden age of carousels. It features shields of faux stained glass depicting each Eevee evolution.

== Food and Drink Offerings ==
Five locations with themed food and drink offerings are located in Sedge Town.

=== Poké Mart ===
A beverage and cookie shop designed to replicate an in-game Poké Mart. Drinks themed after Bulbasaur, Charmander, and Squirtle are available for purchase, as well as cookies with sprites from the Pokémon games. The cookies reflect common items found in Poké Marts.

=== Pikachu's Onigiri Shop ===
A food stall with a female Pikachu mascot. It primarily offers trays of onigiri (rice ball), charcoal karaage (Japanese fried chicken), and strips of ginger. Each tray is one of five unique designs. The shop also sells miso soup.

=== Eevee's Cafe ===
A food stall with an Eevee mascot. Lattes are sold with latte art featuring each evolution of Eevee. Non-alcoholic hot sangria, themed cream buns, and ice cream pops in the shape of Pikachu and Eevee are also available.

=== Altaria's Roost Kitchen ===
A food stall with an Altaria mascot. "Roost" is a flying-type Pokémon move with healing abilities. Sandwiches, spinach in the shape of French fries, and soup are available with small bird foot-like brands on the buns.

=== Snorlax's Popcorn ===
A food stall with a Snorlax mascot. Barbecue and milk caramel popcorn are available for purchase. A novelty popcorn bucket is available decorated with Snorlax sleeping in a path and a Poké Flute, an item used to rouse a sleeping Snorlax in a similar path in Pokémon Red, Blue, and Yellow and other games.

== Mobile Interactive Elements ==
Location-specific Pokémon Go mobile game activities are found in the park. This includes unique tasks to reveal catchable Pokémon that mirror 1:1 statues found in the park, as well as Pokémon that can be battled and caught with a unique background reflecting Sedge Gym.

For the Eevee Week event starting November 21, 2026, a digital commemorative metal can be collected by park-goers in the Pokémon HOME mobile application.

== See also ==
- PokéPark
- Super Nintendo World
