= Joseph Monaghan =

Joseph Monaghan may refer to:

- Joseph P. Monaghan (1906–1985), U.S. Representative from Montana
- Joseph J. Monaghan, Australian physicist
