= Super World =

Super World could refer to:

- Super Mario World
- Super Nintendo World
- Super World of Sports
