= John Monaghan =

John Monaghan may refer to:

- John Monaghan, Author, johnmonaghan.com, NYPD Captain
- John R. Monaghan, United States Navy officer
- John James Joseph Monaghan, American prelate of the Roman Catholic Church
- Rinty Monaghan (John Joseph Monaghan), flyweight boxer from Belfast
- Jack Monaghan (1921–2022), New Zealand amateur wrestler
- John Monaghan (businessman), New Zealand dairy executive with Fonterra

== See also ==
- John Monahan (disambiguation)
