= Cole equation of state =

An equation of state introduced by R. H. Cole

$$p = B \left[ \left( \frac{\rho}{\rho_0} \right)^\gamma  -1 \right] ,$$

where $\rho_0$ is a reference density, $\gamma$ is the adiabatic index, and $B$ is a parameter with pressure units.
