= PokéPark =

Theme park

Pokémon The Park
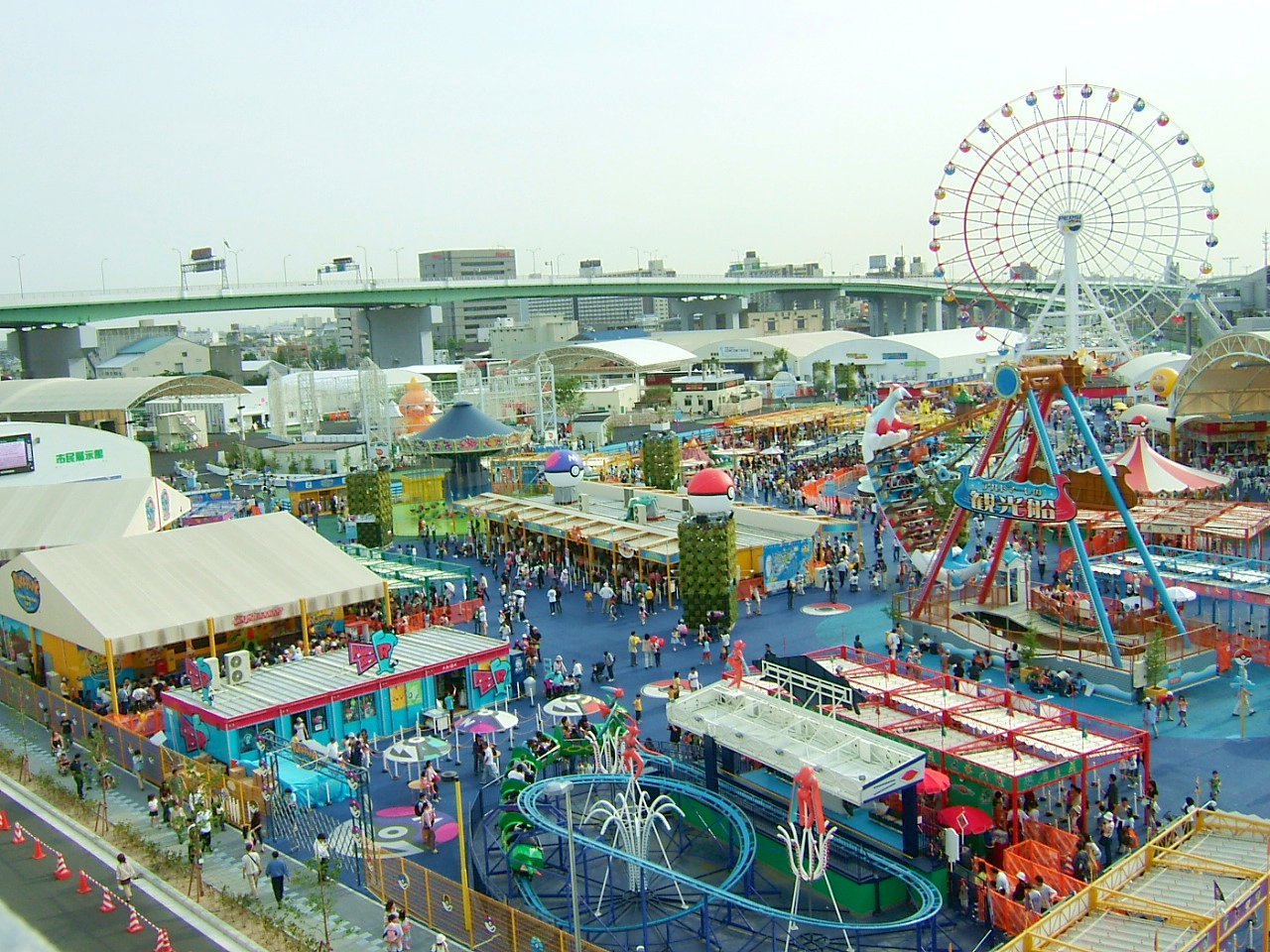
- Location: Nagoya, Japan (2005); Taipei, Taiwan (2006)
- Status: Defunct
- Opened: JP: March 2005; Taiwan: June 2006
- Closed: JP: September 2005; Taiwan: September 2006
- Theme: Pokémon franchise

Pokémon The Park or PokéPark (ポケパーク, PokePāku) was a traveling theme park based on the Pokémon franchise. It previously existed in two locations, both currently closed. The theme parks featured many Pokémon-themed attractions, and were open between March 18, 2005, and September 25, 2005, in Japan.

In 2006, the park toured Taiwan, being showcased from June 23, 2006, to September 24, 2006 The site that housed this installment is now home to the Taipei Children's Amusement Park.

In Japan, it operated under the name Pokémon The Park 2005, and was also simply called PokéPark. It also operated in Taiwan under the name Pokémon The Park, and was also simply called PokéPark.

In 2026, a third park was opened on February 5, 2026, titled PokéPark Kanto as part of the franchise's 30th anniversary. It is the first permanent PokéPark.

== List of attractions ==
The park featured many attractions themed after the franchise. A majority of the rides were sourced from a then-closed Japanese theme park in Izumisano, Osaka. The Taiwan version excluded many of the rides.

Name	Description
Alto Mare Gondola Cruise	A Latias and Latios themed Pirate Ship ride.
Lugia's Spinning Ship	A Lugia-themed Teacups ride.
Gotta Dance Tour	Up and Down attraction based on the song of the same name.
Game Corner	Redemption game center.
Pokémon Merry-go-round	A Carousel ride with Raikou, Entei, and Suicune themed cars.
Pikachu's Forest	A Red Baron style ride with Pikachu-themed cars.
Team Aqua vs Team Magma Crash Car	A Dodgems attraction.
Mudkip’s Big Splash	A Log Flume with Mudkip themed cars.
Pichu Bros.' Rascal Railway	A themed locomotive starring the Pichu Brothers, Wynaut, and Munchlax.
Pokémon Floating Kids	A Play Area.
Pokémon Giant Ferris Wheel	A themed Ferris Wheel with cars decorated to look like a Poké Ball.
Pokémon Night Club	Themed nightclub.
Pokémon Star Swing	A Chair swing ride featuring Jirachi, Celebi, and Mew.
Safari Zone	A shooting attraction where attendees must use Poké Ball-themed cannonballs to catch as many Pokémon as they can.
Twister: Fury in the Sky	Rayquaza-themed Junior Steel Roller Coaster based on Destiny Deoxys. The ride was relocated to Minamichita Beach Land the following year and rebranded as "Sea Dragon Coaster". Hence this attraction was not showcased at the Taiwan installment.

There were two Rocket Pokémon Shops located throughout the park. These shops had accessories for Pokémon fans and items such as Pokémon headgear, T-shirts, postcards, and official PokéPark souvenirs. It shut down because of limited assets. People in the park with a Nintendo DS were able to download a game via DS Download Play entitled PokéPark: Fishing Rally DS. A few people in the park with a Game Boy Advance were also gifted free Pokémon.

== See also ==
- Super Nintendo World
- Kirby Café
