= Look Effects =

Look Effects, Inc.
- Company type: Private
- Industry: Visual effects, CGI animation
- Founded: 1998
- Headquarters: Culver City, CA, Brooklyn, NY, Vancouver, Stuttgart
- Website: lookfx.com

Look Effects was a visual effects company based in Culver City, California. It was founded in 1998, and in 2014 ceased operations, with the staff acquired by Mass Market. They specialized in visual effects for feature films, episodic television, and special venue. Look Effects worked on over 100 major motion pictures and television series including Black Swan, Avatar, Captain America, and The Muppets.

== History ==
- 1998 Look Effects forms in Hollywood, California
- 2008 Opened Look Effects NY in Brooklyn, New York
- 2011 Look Effects relocates from Hollywood to the border of Culver City, California, and Marina del Rey, California
- 2011 Opened Look Effects Vancouver in Gastown Vancouver, British Columbia, Canada
- 2013 Opened Look Effects Germany in Stuttgart, Germany

== Notable films ==
=== 2006 ===
- The Fountain

=== 2010 ===
- Black Swan

=== 2012 ===
- Moonrise Kingdom

=== 2013 ===
- Noah

=== 2014 ===
- The Grand Budapest Hotel

== Notable TV series ==
- Bones
- Lost
- Nashville
- Pushing Daisies
- Game of Thrones
