= Thomas Monaghan =

Thomas Monaghan may refer to:

- Thomas Monaghan (VC), British recipient of the Victoria Cross
- Thomas J. Monaghan (politician) (1914–1992), American politician
- Thomas J. Monaghan (attorney), American attorney
- Thomas Monaghan (hurler) (born 1997), Irish hurler
- Tom Monaghan (born 1937), American entrepreneur
- Tom Monaghan (dual player) (born 1944), Irish hurler, Gaelic footballer and coach
- Tommy Monaghan, a fictional super powered Hitman in DC Comics
