= Craig Monaghan =

American executive

Craig T. Monaghan
- Born: 1957 (age 68–69)
- Education: Lehigh University, University of Pennsylvania
- Occupation: executive
- Known for: CEO of Asbury Automotive Group
- Successor: David Hult

Craig T. Monaghan (born 1957) was the chief executive officer of Asbury Automotive Group.

== Education and career ==
He received his bachelor's degree in industrial engineering from Lehigh University and earned his Master of Business Administration degree from the Wharton School of the University of Pennsylvania.

He is a veteran of the U.S. Army. He commanded a tank unit in South Korea in 1980.

Monaghan got his training in finance positions at General Motors and Bristol-Myers Squibb. He served as Vice President/Treasurer for Reader's Digest.

He was CFO of Sears Holdings Corporation (2006–2007), AutoNation (2000–2006), and iVillage.

Monaghan had been CEO and president of Asbury Automotive Group since 2008.

In August 2017, Monaghan announced that he will step down from his position at Asbury effective January 2018, to be replaced by chief operating officer David Hult.
