= John Monahan =

John Monahan may refer to:

- John Monahan (scientist), Irish-born biochemist and CEO
- John Monahan (law professor), professor at the University of Virginia Law School
- John Monahan (RAF officer), English-born Royal Air Force officer
- F. John Monahan (born 1943), American politician in Massachusetts
- John P. Monahan (born 1932), United States Marine Corps general

== See also ==
- John Moynihan (died 2002), American sports broadcaster
