= Joseph J. Monaghan =

Australian physicist

Joseph J. Monaghan FAA is an Australian physicist and emeritus professor at Monash University. He is known in the area of CFD for the development of the SPH method in 1977.

== Honours ==
- 1999 CSIRO Research Achievement Medal
- 2011 Elected Fellow of the Australian Academy of Science
- Honoris Causa Doctor by Universidad Politecnica de Madrid, 2017
