= Tom Monaghan (dual player) =

Irish hurler & Gaelic footballer (born 1944)

Personal information
- Born: 1944 (age 81–82) Kildorrery, County Cork, Ireland
- Occupation: Bank official
- Height: 5 ft 9 in (175 cm)

Sport
- Sport: Gaelic football
- Position: Left wing-forward
Clubs
- Years: Club
- 1959–1988: Kildorrery; Mitchelstown → Avondhu
Club titles
	Football	Hurling
Cork titles	0	1
Inter-county
Years	County	Apps (scores)
1970	Cork	0 (0–0)
Inter-county titles
- Munster titles: 0
- All-Irelands: 0
- NFL: 0

Thomas Monaghan (born 1944) is an Irish former hurler, Gaelic footballer and coach. At club level he played with Mitchelstown, Kildorrery and divisional side Avondhu, and also lined out at inter-county level with various Cork teams.

== Playing career ==
Monaghan first played hurling at club level with Kildorrery as a 15-year-old in 1959. His career with the team lasted until 1988, by which stage he had won seven North Cork JHC titles. Monaghan also lined out as a Gaelic footballer with the nearby Mitchelstown club. Beginning with a Cork MFC title in 1960, he also won a Cork IFC title in 1965. Monaghan's club performances also earned his selection to the Avondhu divisional team. He lined out in goal when the team beat University College Cork to win the Cork SHC title in 1966.

Monaghan first appeared on the inter-county scene with Cork as a corner forward, on the minor team that won the All-Ireland MFC title in 1961, scoring 2-01 before a record crowd of 90,556 in Croke Park. He was still eligible for the minor grade when he was drafted onto the junior team in 1962. Monaghan made numerous appearances for the team over the course of a decade and won an All-Ireland JFC medal in 1972.

Monaghan simultaneously lined out with the Cork intermediate hurling team, winning four provincial titles as well as an All-Ireland IHC medal in 1965. He made a number of appearances for the Cork senior football team in 1970.

== Coaching career ==
Monaghan was elected to the Cork senior hurling team selection committee in October 1983. During his two-year tenure, Cork won consecutive Munster SHC titles, as well as the All-Ireland SHC title in 1984.

== Honours ==
=== Player ===
Kildorrery

- North Cork Junior A Hurling Championship: 1962, 1963, 1969, 1972, 1973, 1977, 1984, 1988

Mitchelstown

- Cork Intermediate Football Championship: 1965
- Cork Minor Football Championship: 1960

Avondhu

- Cork Senior Hurling Championship: 1966

Cork

- All-Ireland Intermediate Hurling Championship: 1965
- Munster Intermediate Hurling Championship: 1964, 1965, 1967, 1969
- All-Ireland Junior Football Championship: 1972
- Munster Junior Football Championship: 1962, 1970, 1972
- All-Ireland Minor Football Championship: 1961
- Munster Minor Football Championship: 1961

=== Management ===
Cork

- All-Ireland Senior Hurling Championship: 1984
- Munster Senior Hurling Championship: 1984, 1985
