= Xfrog =

3D computer graphics software

Xfrog (X Window Finite Recursive Object Generator) is 3D computer graphics software that runs on Microsoft Windows or as a plug-in for Windows and Mac-OS versions of Autodesk Maya and Maxon Cinema 4D. Xfrog was originally developed by Oliver Deussen and Bernd Lintermann while at the University of Karlsruhe based on their research into natural systems and systematic processes found in nature.

== Overview ==
Xfrog was developed to be an intuitive modeling method and GUI for creating natural branching structures based on the rules of nature. Structure and geometry is encapsulated in objects that form the description of the model. To define a model, icons (graphic representations of components) are assembled in a graph depicting the model's structure and hierarchy, beginning with a root icon. Models are saved in the proprietary Xfrog .xfr format, a text file that contains the complete set of parametric rules for the procedural "Frog"engine to interpret and draw the polygonal model.

== History ==
The first version of Xfrog was released as shareware in 1996 for Silicon Graphics, Sun Microsystems and Linux by Lintermann und Deussen GbR under the name GreenWorks Organic Software. The first customers were Industrial Light and Magic and Disney Imagineering. Xfrog 1.0 did not contain key frame or procedural recursive animation capabilities, but in 1998 Xfrog 2.0 introduced animation capabilities. It was released for the first time as a plugin for Maya 1.0 making Greenworks the first professional plugin developer for Maya. The stand-alone application was ported from SGI to Windows and introduced as Xfrog 3.0 at SIGGRAPH 2000. In 2006, Xfrog's first Cinema 4D plugin, Xfrog 4 for Cinema 4D, added all the components of 3.5 to the Cinema 4D interface. Currently, both the Cinema 4D and Maya plugins are at version 5.2.
