= Michael Moynihan (author) =

American writer

Michael Moynihan is an American author and the nephew of Daniel Patrick Moynihan, former Senator (Democrat) from New York. He wrote The Coming American Renaissance, a rebuttal of works by Lester Thurow and others, argued that America possessed a unique set of economic advantages that would propel it to global leadership in the 21st century. Moynihan cited technology leadership, in particular, as a driver of economic growth. He worked in the Clinton administration as an advisor to Secretaries of the Treasury, Lawrence Summers and Robert Rubin from 1996 to 1999. Moynihan was in charge of Internet and electronic commerce policy and was involved with the effort to pass the Internet Tax Freedom Act. Moynihan founded the Internet website AlwaysonTV.

== Books ==
- The Coming American Renaissance, Simon and Schuster (1996. ISBN 068481207X)
