= Crowd analysis =

Crowd analysis is the practice of interpreting data on the natural movement of groups or objects. Masses of bodies, particularly humans, are the subjects of these crowd tracking analyses that include how a particular crowd moves and when a movement pattern changes. Researchers use the data to predict future crowd movement, crowd density, and plan responses to potential events such as those that require evacuation routes. Applications of crowd analysis can range from video game crowd simulation to security and surveillance.

== Background ==
Due to population growth, crowd analysis has become a major interest in social and technical disciplines. People use crowd analysis to develop crowd management strategies in public events as well as public space design, visual surveillance, and virtual environments. Goals include to make areas more convenient, and prevent crowd induced disasters.

Some crowds cannot be analyzed as easily as others. The psychology of a crowd impacts how it is broken up and studied. Crowds can be casual, such as a group of pedestrian walking down the road, or planned, like people participating in a marathon or a protest. They can be as active and erratic as a mob, or as passive as an audience. While the main crowd is the subject of the bulk of the analysis, anomalies must be taken into account, like someone opposing the flow of traffic or a biker travelling through a group of walkers. Hence, the purpose of a group of individuals determines the interpretation of the data obtained. Significant research has been done to understand the way crowds move in order to predict where areas of conflicts may occur. This research is done by analyzing data from crowds, and then proceeding to create models of similar situations using software. Many models that simulate crowd behavior exist, with some stating "macroscopic models like network-based models or fluid-dynamics models as well as microscopic models like e.g. the Social Force Model or Cellular Automata."

== Methodology ==
Crowd density refers to the number of objects within a unit area, such as people per square meter. Density is important to determine the maximum occupancy of a room or building to address safety concerns. Analyzing areas that become more densely packed than others is essential for designing buildings and evacuation routes. Addressing such concerns involves the management and optimization of the crowd and allows one to predict movement patterns.

Crowd flow involves the speed that objects in a crowd move in a space. At a critical capacity, flow begins to decrease as crowd density increases. The Yerkes-Dodson law explains how performance is impacted by the amount of stress on an individual. The stress is caused by external factors such as an object coming at the individual, a time constraint for the individual to perform a task, or the number of agents crowding an individual.

In regard to computer animation, simulated individuals (referred to as agents) are often written to portray realistic crowd-like behavior. They follow an algorithm based on stress, navigation fields, and surrounding agents in order to manipulate behavior. The study of producing intelligent agents to follow lifelike behavior falls under the field of artificial intelligence.

== Applications ==
The data drawn from crowd analysis is invaluable in a range of fields and real world implementations.

=== Crowd Artificial Intelligence ===
Otherwise referred to as swarm intelligence, the analysis and application of crowd movement can contribute to the modeling of group behavior based on biological and artificial models. Social instinct behavior is applied to complex systems that model multiple agents and their interactions. Population-based methods are used to represent local interactions of agents with their surroundings.

=== Sociology ===
There are countless social applications of crowd analysis, ranging from uses within the film and video game industries, to uses in public planning. Being that crowd simulations are based on group dynamics and crowd psychology, the accuracy and relevance to real life situations is clear. A large aspect of public planning and its use of crowd analysis lies within the realm of situational representations for emergency evacuation. Evacuations can be planned via the modeling and study of crowd interaction and reaction. These representations are based on biological models and patterns, thus the movements predicted are quite realistic. Similar models are utilized within motion picture industries to produce realistic and lifelike simulations and scenes.

=== Simulations ===
A system can generate a realistic crowd simulation with given inputs and simulate how the simulated moving objects, or agents, will interact with each other and with the environment. The goal is to replicate a crowd's movement patterns given numerous agents in a given space. Algorithms based on crowd analysis attempt to manage the movement of the crowd. The more efficient and realistic a simulation becomes, the more complex the algorithm must become. The software must be able to manipulate the trajectory of individual agents based on variables such as the agents' goals, stress forces, obstacles, and levels of arousal.

== See also ==
- Activity recognition
- Crowd counting
- Crowd manipulation
- Crowd simulation
- Multi-agent system
- Social network analysis
- Swarm intelligence
- Crowd collapses and crushes
