= Monahan =

Monahan, and close variants, is a name of Gaelic origin, derived from manachán, a diminutive of Irish: Manach Latin: Monachus, a monk. It may refer to:

== Saints ==
- See Mainchín

== People ==
=== Entertainment ===
- Dan Monahan (born 1955), American actor
- Darren Monahan, American Chief Information Officer and Producer, Obsidian Entertainment
- David Monahan (born 1971), American actor
- Gordon Monahan (born 1956), Canadian musician and composer
- Matthew Monahan (born 1972), American artist based in Los Angeles
- Meghan Monahan (born 2001), American artist
- Pat Monahan (born 1969), American lead singer and songwriter for Train
- Patrick Monahan (comedian) (born 1976), Irish-Iranian stand-up comedian
- Sarah Monahan (born 1977), Australian actress
- William Monahan (born 1960), American screenwriter

=== Sports ===
- Garry Monahan (born 1946), retired Canadian professional ice hockey center
- Hartland Monahan (born 1951), retired Canadian ice hockey player
- Leo Monahan (artist) (born 1933), American paper artist
- Leo Monahan (sportswriter) (1926–2013), American sports journalist
- Rinty Monahan (1928–2003), Major League Baseball pitcher
- Sean Monahan (born 1994), Canadian professional ice hockey player
- Shane Monahan (born 1974), former Major League Baseball outfielder and designated hitter
- Shane Monahan (rugby union), Irish professional rugby union player

=== Other ===
- Alfred Monahan (1877–1945), Anglican bishop of Monmouth
- Brian Monahan, Attending physician of the United States Congress
- Don Monahan, Canadian politician
- Haven Monahan, the alleged perpetrator of the sexual assault in the now-retracted Rolling Stone article "A Rape on Campus"
- J. C. Monahan, American meteorologist and TV presenter
- James G. Monahan (1855–1923), U.S. representative from Wisconsin
- Jay Monahan (born 1970) The Commissioner of the PGA Tour
- Patrick J. Monahan (born 1954), Dean of Osgoode Hall Law School of York University in Toronto,

== See also ==
- Minogue
- Monaghan (surname)
- Monohon

== Notes and references ==
=== Secondary sources ===
- Lanigan, John (1829). The Irish Church (ed.). An Ecclesiastical History of Ireland, from the first introduction of Christianity among the Irish, to the beginning of the thirteenth century. Vol. III (second ed.). Dublin: J. Cumming, 16, L. Ormond-Quay; London: Simpkin and Marshall; Edinburgh: R. Cadell and Co. pp. 30–32.
- Wall, James Charles (1905). J. Charles Cox (ed.). Shrines of British Saints, with numerous illustrations (PDF). Methuen & Co., 36 Essex Street WC, London, England. p. 83. (subscription required)
