= Firsts in animation =

This list provides an overview of animated productions that can be considered as first-time milestones in the development of animation techniques or in commercial success.

== Early animation techniques ==
Joseph Plateau's illustration of the phenakistiscope in Correspondance mathématique et physique (1833)

=== 17th to 19th century: before film ===
Year	Milestone	Notes
1659	Introduction of the magic lantern	by Christiaan Huygens, with moving images
1825	Introduction of the thaumatrope	by John Ayrton Paris
1833	Introduction of the phenakistiscope	The first device used for stroboscopic animation. Invented simultaneously by Joseph Plateau and Simon Stampfer
1866	Introduction of the zoetrope	Similar cylindrical animation devices had already been proposed by Simon Stampfer (1833) and William Horner (1834)
1868	Flip book patented	by John Barnes Linnett, under the name of "kineograph"
1877	Introduction of the praxinoscope	by Charles-Émile Reynaud
1892	First theatrical animation in long strips	Reynaud's Théâtre Optique (patented in 1888) at the Musée Grévin

=== Silent era ===
Year	Milestone	Notes
1898	Animation on standard filmstrip	Introduced by Gebrüder Bing for toy projectors, lithographed in colour by 1902
1914	Application for cel animation patent	By Earl Hurd, granted in 1915
1915	Application for Rotoscope patent	By Max Fleischer, granted 1917

== Earliest animations by country ==
Continent	Country		Work	Type of Work	Type of Distribution	Length	Release/Premiere Year	End Year	Ref.
Europe	France		L'Aquarium	Movie	Theatrical	Short	1878	—N/a	
Europe	France		Un bon bock	Movie	Theatrical	Medium	1892	—N/a	
Europe	France		The Tale of the Fox	Movie	Theatrical	Feature	1937	—N/a	
Europe	France		Joe the Little Boom Boom	Series	Television	—N/a	1960	1963	
Europe	United Kingdom	England	The Clown and His Donkey	Movie	Theatrical	Short	1910	—N/a	
Europe	United Kingdom	England	The Little Island	Movie	Theatrical	Medium	1958	—N/a	
Europe	United Kingdom	England	Handling Ships	Movie	Theatrical	Feature	1945	—N/a	
Europe	United Kingdom	England	A Rubovian Legend	Series	Television	—N/a	1955	1964	
Europe	United Kingdom	Wales	The Little Engine That Could	Movie	Direct-to-video	Medium	1991	—N/a	
Europe	United Kingdom	Wales	The Princess and the Goblin	Movie	Theatrical	Feature	1991	—N/a	
Europe	United Kingdom	Wales	SuperTed	Series	Television	—N/a	1983	1986	
Europe	United Kingdom	Scotland	Sir Billi	Movie	Theatrical	Feature	2012	—N/a	
Europe	United Kingdom	Scotland	The Family-Ness	Series	Television	—N/a	1984	1985	
Europe	United Kingdom	Northern Ireland	Lifeboat Luke	Series	Television	—N/a	2008		
Europe	United Kingdom	Northern Ireland	Macropolis	Movie	Theatrical	Short	2012	—N/a	
Europe	Germany		Rhythmus 21	Movie	Theatrical	Short	1921	—N/a	
Europe	Germany		Judas & Jesus	Movie	Theatrical	Medium	2009	—N/a	
Europe	Germany		The Adventures of Prince Achmed	Movie	Theatrical	Feature	1926	—N/a	
Europe	Germany		Die Sendung mit der Maus	Series	Television	—N/a	1971	Present	
Europe	Italy		The War and the Dream of Momi	Movie	Theatrical	Medium	1917	—N/a	
Europe	Italy		The Dynamite Brothers	Movie	Theatrical	Feature	1949		
Europe	Italy		La Linea	Series	Television	—N/a	1971	1986	
Europe	Latvia		Lietaina diena	Movie	Theatrical	Short	1969	—N/a	
Europe	Latvia		The Gold of the Tigers	Movie	Theatrical	Medium	1995	—N/a	
Europe	Latvia		Ness un Nesija	Movie	Theatrical	Feature	1991	—N/a	
Europe	Latvia		Fantadroms	Series	Television	—N/a	1985	1995	
Europe	Russia		The Cameraman's Revenge	Movie	Theatrical	Short	1912	—N/a	
Europe	Russia		In a Faraway Kingdom...	Movie	Theatrical	Medium	1957	—N/a	
Europe	Russia		The New Gulliver	Movie	Theatrical	Feature	1935	—N/a	
Europe	Russia		Happy Merry-Go-Round	Series	Television	—N/a	1969	2001	
Asia	Japan		Katsudō Shashin	Movie	Theatrical	Short	c. 1907	—N/a	
Asia	Japan		Momotarō's Sea Eagles	Movie	Theatrical	Medium	1943	—N/a	
Asia	Japan		Momotaro: Sacred Sailors	Movie	Theatrical	Feature	1945	—N/a	
Asia	Japan		The New Adventures of Pinocchio	Series	Television	—N/a	1961	1961	
Asia	Japan		The Wizard of Oz	Movie	Direct-to-Video	Feature	1982	—N/a	
Asia	Japan		Dallos	Series	Direct-to-Video	—N/a	1983	1984, 1985	
Asia	Philippines		A Boy Playing Yoyo and Girl Jumping Rope	Movie	Amateur	Short	1953	—N/a	
Asia	Philippines		Libingan	Movie	Theatrical	Medium	2007	—N/a	
Asia	Philippines		Adarna: The Mythical Bird	Movie	Theatrical	Feature	1997	—N/a	
Asia	Philippines		Tadhana	Movie	Television	Feature	1978	—N/a	
Asia	Philippines		Poptech Series	Series	Television	—N/a	1980	1984	
Asia	Bangladesh		The Story of a Village	Movie	Theatrical	Short	1970s	—N/a	
Asia	Bangladesh		Murgi Keno Mutant	Movie	Theatrical	Medium	2011	—N/a	
Asia	Bangladesh		Khoka Theke Bangabandhu Jatir Pita	Movie	Theatrical	Feature	2021	—N/a	
Asia	Bangladesh		Meena	Series	Television	—N/a	1991	2010	
Asia	Thailand		Amazing Incidents	Movie	Theatrical	Short	1955	—N/a	
Asia	Thailand		hesheit	Movie	Theatrical	Medium	2005	—N/a	
Asia	Thailand		The Adventure of Sudsakorn	Movie	Theatrical	Feature	1979	—N/a	
Asia	Thailand		PangPond: The Future World Adventure	Series	Television	—N/a	2002		
Asia	Saudi Arabia		World of Twitter	Movie	Theatrical	Short	2014	—N/a	
Asia	Saudi Arabia		But Where Does It Come From	Movie	Direct-to-video	Medium	1996	—N/a	
Asia	Saudi Arabia		Masameer: The Movie	Movie	Theatrical	Feature	2020	—N/a	
Asia	Saudi Arabia		Shadeed and Tammam	Series	Television	—N/a	2003	2003	
Africa	Egypt		Nothing To Do	Movie	Theatrical	Short	1936	—N/a	
Africa	Egypt		East West? East West	Movie	Theatrical	Medium	2009	—N/a	
Africa	Egypt		The Boy and the King	Movie	Theatrical	Feature	1992	—N/a	
Africa	Egypt		Bakkar	Series	Television	—N/a	1998	2025	
Africa	Ivory Coast		Kimboo	Series	Television	—N/a	1989	1990	
South America	Argentina		La intervención en la provincia de Buenos Aires	Movie	Theatrical	Short	1916	—N/a	
South America	Argentina		Little Red Riding Hood	Movie	Theatrical	Medium	1965	—N/a	
South America	Argentina		El Apóstol	Movie	Theatrical	Feature	1917	—N/a	
South America	Argentina		The Adventures of Hijitus	Series	Television	—N/a	1967	1996	
South America	Brazil		O Kaiser	Movie	Theatrical	Short	1917	—N/a	
South America	Brazil		O Dragãozinho Manso – Jonjoca	Movie	Theatrical	Medium	1942	—N/a	
South America	Brazil		Amazon Symphony	Movie	Theatrical	Feature	1954	—N/a	
South America	Brazil		Monica and Friends	Series	Television	—N/a	1976	Present	
North America	Canada		The Wizard of Oz	Movie	Theatrical	Short	1933	—N/a	
North America	Canada		Stop That Tank!	Movie	Theatrical	Medium	1942	—N/a	
North America	Canada		The Enchanted Village	Movie	Theatrical	Feature	1955	—N/a	
North America	Canada		Cartoon Party	Series	Television	—N/a	1959	1962	
North America	United States		Humorous Phases of Funny Faces	Movie	Theatrical	Short	1906	—N/a	
North America	United States		The Einstein Theory of Relativity	Movie	Theatrical	Medium	1923	—N/a	
North America	United States		Creation	Movie	Theatrical	Feature	1915	—N/a	
North America	United States		Crusader Rabbit	Series	Television	—N/a	1950	1959	
North America	United States		The Flight of Dragons	Movie	Direct-to-video	Feature	1982	—N/a	
North America	United States		The Greatest Adventure: Stories from the Bible	Series	Direct-to-Video	—N/a	1985	1992	
Oceania	Australia		Waste Not, Want Not	Movie	Theatrical	Short	1938	—N/a	
Oceania	Australia		Australian History	Movie	Theatrical	Medium	1971	—N/a	
Oceania	Australia		A Connecticut Yankee in King Arthur's Court	Movie	Theatrical	Feature	1970	—N/a	
Oceania	Australia		Arthur! And the Square Knights of the Round Table	Series	Television	—N/a	1966	1968	
Oceania	New Zealand		The Frog, the Dog and the Devil	Movie	Theatrical	Short	1986	—N/a	
Oceania	New Zealand		Footrot Flats: The Dog's Tail Tale	Movie	Theatrical	Feature	1986	—N/a	
Oceania	New Zealand		Oscar and Friends	Series	Television	—N/a	1995	1996	

== Techniques ==
=== Animation ===
First films/television series to be created using various animation techniques
Type	Form	Media	Title	Release Date
Hand-drawn	Paper	Short film	Fantasmagorie	1908
Hand-drawn	Cel	Short film	The Sinking of the Lusitania	1918
Hand-drawn	Cel	Feature film	Snow White and the Seven Dwarfs	1937
Hand-drawn	Cel	Television series	Crusader Rabbit	1948
Hand-drawn	Oil-painted	Short film	Conversation in Space	1961
Hand-drawn	Oil-painted	Feature film	Loving Vincent	2017
Hand-drawn	Digital ink and paint	Short film	Off His Rockers	1992
Hand-drawn	Digital ink and paint	Feature film	The Rescuers Down Under	1990
Hand-drawn	Digital ink and paint	Television series	Pac-Man	1982
Stop-motion		Short film	Matches: An Appeal	1899
Stop-motion	Clay	Short film	The Sculptor's Nightmare	1908
Stop-motion	Clay	Feature film	I Go Pogo	1980
Stop-motion	Clay	Television series	The Gumby Show	1955
Stop-motion	Puppet	Short film	The Humpty Dumpty Circus	1908
Stop-motion	Puppet	Feature film	The Tale of the Fox	1937
Stop-motion	Puppet	Television series	The New Adventures of Pinocchio	1960
Stop-motion	Silhouette	Short film	The Sporting Mice	1909
Stop-motion	Silhouette	Feature film	The Adventures of Prince Achmed	1926
Stop-motion	Cutout	Short film	Die Schöne Prinzessin von China	1917
Stop-motion	Cutout	Feature film	El Apóstol	1917
Stop-motion	Cutout	Television series	Captain Pugwash	1957
Rotoscoping		Short film	The Clown's Pup (Out of the Inkwell)	1919
Rotoscoping		Feature film	Gulliver's Travels	1939
Rotoscoping		Television series	Tarzan, Lord of the Jungle	1976
Digital	CGI	Short film	A Computer Animated Hand	1972
Digital	CGI	Feature film	Toy Story	1995
Digital	CGI	Television series	ReBoot	1994
Digital	Flash	Feature film	Wizards and Giants	2003
Digital	Flash	Television series	¡Mucha Lucha!	2002
Digital	Flash	Web series	The Goddamn George Liquor Program	1997
Digital	Machinima	Short film	Diary of a Camper	1996
Digital	Machinima	Feature film	The Seal of Nehahra	2000
Digital	Machinima	Web series	Red vs. Blue	2003
Digital	Motion capture	Short film	Adam Powers, The Juggler	1981
Digital	Motion capture	Feature film	Sinbad: Beyond the Veil of Mists	2001

==== Computer animation ====
===== 1958–1975 =====
Film	Year	Notes
Vertigo	1958	To create the spirals seen in the opening credit sequence of his film, Alfred Hitchcock hired John Whitney, who used a WWII anti-aircraft targeting computer called "The M5 gun director" mounted on a rotating platform with a pendulum hanging above it that it tracked. Its scope was filmed to create the various spiral elements used in the opening sequence. The raw footage was curated with the aid of graphic designer Saul Bass, and the final nearly two-minute-long sequence became the first computer-animated sequence in a feature film.
Rendering of a planned highway	1961	In 1961, a 50-second vector animation of a car traveling up a planned highway at 110 km/h (70 mph) was created at the Swedish Royal Institute of Technology on the BESK computer. The short animation was broadcast on November 9, 1961, on national television.
Simulation of a Two-Gyro Gravity-Gradient Attitude Control System	1963	Edward E. Zajac, a researcher at Bell Labs, used an IBM computer to create a short showing a communication satellite orbiting Earth.
Boeing Man	1964	William Fetter, a graphic designer working for Boeing, created the first wireframe animation.
Hypercube	1965	A groundbreaking animation made by A. Michael Noll using an IBM 7094. Shows two 4-D cubes on each side.
Hummingbird	1967	A ten-minute computer-animated film by Charles Csuri and James Shaffer. This was awarded a prize at the 4th annual International Experimental Film Competition in Brussels, Belgium and in the collection of The Museum of Modern Art, New York City. The subject was a line drawing of a hummingbird for which a sequence of movements appropriate to the bird was programmed. Over 30,000 images comprising some 25 motion sequences were generated by the computer.
Flexipede	1967	The first entertainment cartoon. Made by Tony Pritchett on the Atlas Computer Laboratory near Oxford and first shown publicly at the Cybernetic Serendipity exhibition in 1968.
Kitty	1968	A group of Soviet mathematicians and physicists headed by Nikolay Konstantinov created a mathematically computable model of the physics of a moving cat. The algorithms were programmed on the BESM-4 computer. The computer then printed hundreds of frames to be later converted to film. An accompanying scientific paper describes the foundation of the employed physics simulation techniques that nowadays are commonly applied to animation films and computer games.
Metadata	1971	This is an experimental 2D-animated short drawn on a data tablet by Peter Foldes, who used the world's first key-frame animation software, invented by Nestor Burtnyk and Marceli Wein.
The Andromeda Strain	1971	First use of digital rendering within a feature film. A diagram of the underground laboratory was created using 2D planes and a complex wireframe cylindrical core.
Out of the Unknown	1971	Produced by Charles McGhie, some early computer-generated imagery (CGI) techniques were combined with stop-motion and real-time visual effects to create the opening title sequence for the show's fourth and final series.
Willy Wonka & the Chocolate Factory	1971	First use of Scanimate in a feature film. The analog computer animation system was used to create sing-along segments for the Oompa Loompa song after Augustus Gloop and Veruca Salt get their comeuppance for their respective vices. Added to the United States National Film Registry in 2016.
A Computer Animated Hand	1972	Directed by Ed Catmull, the short demonstrates a computer-animated hand, as well as human faces. Added to the United States National Film Registry in 2009.
Westworld	1973	First use of digital 2D computer animation in a significant entertainment feature film. The point of view of Yul Brynner's gunslinger was achieved with raster graphics.
Faces (Faces & Body Parts)	1974	Fred Parke's thesis film on facial modeling at the University of Utah.
UFO: Target Earth	1974	An alien in the movie was created with CGI.
Great	1975	The Academy Award-winning 1975 short film about the life of the Victorian engineer Isambard Kingdom Brunel contains a brief sequence of a rotating wire-frame model of Brunel's final project, the iron steamship SS Great Eastern.

===== 1976–present =====
Film	Year	Notes
Logan's Run	1976	Used Scanimate to create the forcefield in the Carousel sequence.
Futureworld	1976	First use of digital 3D computer graphics for animated hand and face. Used 2D digital compositing to materialize characters over a background.
Hobart Street Scene	1976	First use of a 3D hidden-line removal movie depicting an architectural street scene. It shows the planned Crown Courts in Hobart in 1976 and was used for planning approval. The buildings still exist today.
Demon Seed	1977	Used raster wire-frame model rendering for the Proteus IV's monitors.
Star Wars	1977	Used an 3D animated wire-frame graphic for the trench run briefing sequence on Yavin 4. Added to the United States National Film Registry in 1989.
Alien	1979	Used raster wire-frame model rendering for navigation monitors in the landing sequence. Added to the United States National Film Registry in 2001.
The Black Hole	1979	Used raster wire-frame model rendering for the opening credits depicting a 3D wire-frame of a black hole.
Looker	1981	First computer-generated model of a whole human body. Also, first use of 3D-shaded CGI.
The Works	1982	The New York Institute of Technology Computer Graphics Lab debuted a trailer at SIGGRAPH for their CGI project. This would have been the first feature-length CGI film, but it was never completed.
Star Trek II: The Wrath of Khan	1982	Industrial Light & Magic (ILM) computer graphics division develops "Genesis Effect", the first use of a fractal-generated landscape in a film. Bill Reeves leads the Genesis Effect programming team, and creates a new graphics technique called "Particle Systems". Added to the United States National Film Registry in 2024.
Tron	1982	First extensive use of CGI including the Light Cycle sequence. Also includes very early facial animation (for the Master Control Program). A sequence of 15 minutes of the film was fully computer-generated.
Return of the Jedi	1983	First Star Wars film to use shaded CGI. Translucent shaded models were used for the holographic diagram of the second Death Star orbiting Endor during the Rebel briefing sequence. Added to the United States National Film Registry in 2021.
Rock & Rule	1983	First animated film to use CGI graphics.
Golgo 13	1983	First Japanese animated film to include CGI sequences. Entirely digital models of revolvers, skeletons, helicopters, and skyscrapers (created by Toyo Links Corporation and Osaka University's CGI division) are used in the film's title sequence and part of the climax; the remainder of the film is traditionally animated by Tokyo Movie Shinsha.
Dream Flight	1983	First 3D-generated film telling a story, shown in the Electronic Theater at SIGGRAPH 1983.
The Last Starfighter	1984	Uses CGI for all spaceship shots, replacing classic models. First use of "integrated CGI" where the visual effects are supposed to represent real-world objects.
Lensman: Secret of The Lens	1984	Uses CGI for spaceships and other scenes.
The Adventures of André and Wally B.	1984	Lucasfilm's computer animation company creates an all-CGI-animated short. The first CGI animation with motion blur effects and squash and stretch motion.
2010: The Year We Make Contact	1984	Jupiter's turbulent atmosphere is CGI-rendered, mostly during the black spot shots.
Tony de Peltrie	1985	First CGI-animated human character to express emotion through his face and body language.
Weird Science	1985	First use of Perlin noise in a feature film.
The Jetsons & Yogi's Treasure Hunt	1985	The first animated series to use digital ink and paint.
Young Sherlock Holmes	1985	Lucasfilm Ltd. creates the first photorealistic CGI character, "stained glass knight" with 10 seconds of screentime. First digitally created matte painting. First use of digital compositing in a feature film.
"Money for Nothing"	1985	The first CGI music video. The animators would go on to found Mainframe Entertainment.
Labyrinth	1986	First realistic CGI animal.
The Great Mouse Detective	1986	The first Disney film to extensively use computer animation, notably for the two-minute clock tower sequence.
Flight of the Navigator	1986	The first use of reflection mapping in a feature film, used for the flying alien spacecraft.
Howard the Duck	1986	First digital wire removal in a feature film. First use of the Pixar Image Computer in film.
Luxo Jr.	1986	First use of shadows in CGI, made with the specially developed software Photorealistic Renderman. First Pixar film, and first CGI short film to be nominated for an Academy Award. Added to the United States National Film Registry in 2015.
Star Trek IV: The Voyage Home	1986	First use of the Cyberware 3D scanner, first 3D morphing.
The Golden Child	1986	First use of primitive photorealistic morphing.
Captain Power and the Soldiers of the Future	1987	First TV series to include characters modeled entirely with computers.
Knightmare	1987	First game show with interaction between humans and computer-generated surroundings.
Rendez-vous in Montreal	1987	First 3D-generated film involving virtual actors Marilyn Monroe and Humphrey Bogart.
Willow	1988	First extensive photorealistic use of CGI morphing effects in a feature film.
Akira	1988	CGI is used to animate the pattern indicator, to plot the paths of falling objects, model parallax effects on backgrounds, and tweak lighting and lens flares.
Tin Toy	1988	First CGI-animated short film to win an Academy Award. Added to the United States National Film Registry in 2003.
The Abyss	1989	First digital CGI water visual effects. Final use of analog compositing for the majority of visual effects.
The Jim Henson Hour	1989	TV series with real-time and rendered CGI featuring digitally puppeteered CGI character "Waldo".
Back to the Future Part II	1989	Uses VistaGlide and digital compositing to make Michael J. Fox appear onscreen as three different characters simultaneously. First digitally manipulated matte painting.
Les Fables géométriques	1989	First broadcast series of CGI-animated shorts.
The Hunt for Red October	1990	An early use of particle effects to integrate realistic bubble trails and water flow into miniature shots. Scott E. Anderson wrote the code for the dedicated particle system, psys, that created the effects.
Total Recall	1990	Use of motion-capture for CGI characters. This primitive form of motion-capture involved tracing the animation of CGI skeleton models by hand over footage of the performers.
RoboCop 2	1990	An early use of real-time computer graphics or "digital puppetry" to create a character in a motion picture.
Die Hard 2	1990	First animated digitally manipulated matte painting.
Ghost	1990	An early use of CGI to create characters that interact with live actors.
The Rescuers Down Under	1990	First 2D-animated film to be produced with solely digital ink and paint (CAPS). First fully-digital feature film.
Backdraft	1991	First use of photorealistic CGI fire in a motion picture.
Terminator 2: Judgment Day	1991	First realistic human movements on a CGI character. The first computer-generated main character and the first blockbuster movie to feature multiple morphing effects. First use of a personal computer to create the main movie's 3D effects. Added to the National Film Registry in 2023.
Fire Beast	1991	An experimental CGI short that featured the first-ever digital rendering of fur, using a digital differential analyzer.
Quarxs	1991	One of the earliest CGI-animated series.
The Lawnmower Man	1992	First feature film to use computer animation to explore the subject of virtual reality. First virtual reality sex scene. First use of motion-capture involving the recording of a performer's movements into a 3D space as opposed to keyframe animation.
The Babe	1992	First computer-generated crowds.
Death Becomes Her	1992	First human skin CGI software.
The Muppet Christmas Carol	1992	First use of a greenscreen for digital chroma key compositing in a feature film.
Babylon 5	1993	First television series to use CGI as the primary method for its visual effects. First TV use of virtual sets.
The Incredible Crash Dummies	1993	First fully CGI-animated TV special.
Jurassic Park	1993	First photorealistic CGI dinosaurs. First digital face replacement. Added to the United States National Film Registry in 2018.
Live & Kicking	1993	First TV program to feature a live computer-generated character as part of its cast.
VeggieTales	1993	First completely CGI-animated direct-to-video release.
Insektors	1993	First fully computer-animated TV series. First use of character animation in a computer-animated television series.
The Crow	1994	First deceased actor (Brandon Lee) to be recreated through CGI.
The Flintstones	1994	First realistic CGI-rendered fur.
The Mask	1994	First use of CGI to transform a live actor into a photorealistic cartoon character.
ReBoot	1994	First half-hour computer-animated TV series.
Radioland Murders	1994	First use of virtual CGI sets with live actors.
Casper	1995	First CGI main character in a feature-length live-action film, and first CGI characters to interact realistically with live actors.
Batman Forever	1995	First CGI stunt doubles, created through motion-capture.
Waterworld	1995	First realistic CGI water.
Casino	1995	First use of digital compositing to create a period-appropriate setting, and first use of radiosity lighting in a feature film.
Toy Story	1995	First CGI feature-length film. Added to the United States National Film Registry in 2005.
Cassiopeia	1996	First non-Pixar feature-length CGI animation and first CGI feature film not to use scanned models for heads. First Brazilian and Latin American CGI feature animation. Produced and released by NDR Filmes.
Twister	1996	First realistic CGI natural disaster, created using particle effects.
Dragonheart	1996	First 2D all-CGI backgrounds with live-actors. First film to use ILM's Caricature software (created during the film's production).
The Island of Dr. Moreau	1996	First film to use motion-capture to portray a CGI character.
Donkey Kong Country	1996	First half-hour computer-animated TV series to use performance-capture for its characters.
Beast Wars: Transformers	1996	First CGI Transformers animated series produced by Mainframe Entertainment. Sequel to the original Transformers.
Star Wars (Episodes IV, V and VI Special Editions)	1997	First re-release of a film to include CGI characters and elements.
Marvin the Martian in the Third Dimension	1997	First CGI film created for viewing with 3D glasses.
Spawn	1997	First extensive use of CGI fire in a feature film beyond sweetening. First film to integrate a CGI fabric onto a character's costume.
Titanic	1997	First wide-release feature film with CGI elements rendered under the open-source Linux operating system. Also included a number of advances, specifically in the rendering of flowing water.
A Bug's Life	1998	First CGI anamorphic widescreen film. First all-digital transfer to DVD. First film to be reframed for home video releases.
Antz	1998	First DreamWorks Animation CGI feature-length film in the U.S.
Invasion: Earth	1998	First major use of digital effects in a British TV series.
What Dreams May Come	1998	First use of CGI in combination with 3D location scanning (Lidar) and motion-analysis based 3D camera tracking in a feature film.
Fight Club	1999	First photogrammetry based virtual cinematography scenes, including the first bullet time sex scene with fully naked body renderings of body doubles for Helena Bonham Carter and Brad Pitt; renderings of different settings with both extreme close-ups and wide shots; and the first very photorealistic close-up rendering of a human face - which also belongs to a famous actor in a leading role (Edward Norton) - with detailed facial deformation and extreme close-ups (starting at the cell-level of the brain, flying through the different layers of tissues, a follicle and the skin with sweat droplets).
The Matrix	1999	First use of CGI interpolation with bullet time effects. Added to the National Film Registry in 2010.
Star Wars: Episode I – The Phantom Menace	1999	First film to have a fully CGI-rendered supporting character using performance footage captured on-set, pioneering this commonly used technique. Extensive use of CGI for thousands of shots, including backgrounds, visual effects, vehicles, and crowds.
Sinbad: Beyond the Veil of Mists	2000	First feature-length film to be created using motion-capture technology.
Final Fantasy: The Spirits Within	2001	First CGI feature-length digital film to be made based on photorealism and live-action principles. The first theatrically released feature film to utilize motion-capture for all of its characters' actions.
Jimmy Neutron: Boy Genius	2001	First CGI feature-length movie made using off-the-shelf hardware and software.
Shrek	2001	First CGI-animated movie to win an Academy Award for Best Animated Feature Film. Added to the United States National Film Registry in 2020.
The Lord of the Rings: The Fellowship of the Ring	2001	First use of AI for digital actors (using the Massive software developed by Weta Digital).
The Lord of the Rings: The Two Towers	2002	First virtual actor to win an award (Critics' Choice Movie Awards by Andy Serkis playing Gollum), in the newly created category Best Digital Acting Performance.
Spider-Man	2002	First digitally-rendered photorealistic costume.
Ice Age	2002	First CGI full-length feature animated film exclusively rendered with a ray tracer (CGI Studio).
The Matrix Reloaded	2003	The Burly Brawl - the first use of "universal capture", the combination of markerless motion capture, per-frame texture capture and optical flow of pixels over the data from 7 camera setup bought into a shared UV space by projection onto a neutral expression geometry leading to the introduction of realistic digital look-alikes.
Able Edwards	2004	First movie was shot completely on a greenscreen using digitally scanned images as backgrounds.
Olocoons	2004	First CGI-animated series to use cel-shaded designs and backgrounds mixed with 2D elements.
Shrek 2	2004	First feature film to use global illumination.
Sky Captain and the World of Tomorrow	2004	First movie with all-CGI backgrounds and live actors.
Chicken Little	2005	First feature-length CGI-animated film released in 3D.
Elephants Dream	2006	First CGI short movie released as completely open source. Made with open-source software, theatrical and DVD release under Creative Commons License. Unique that all 3D models, animatics and software are included on the DVD free for any use.
Flatland	2007	First CGI feature film to be animated by one person. Made with Lightwave 3D and Adobe After Effects.
Plumíferos	2009	First CGI feature-length movie made using open source/free software for all 3D models, animation, lighting and render process, under Linux operating system.
Avatar	2009	First full-length movie made using motion-capture to create photorealistic 3D characters and to feature a fully CGI 3D photorealistic world. The first virtual art department and complete virtual production pipeline was developed by director James Cameron and team to create the film in real-time.
Up	2009	First CGI-animated feature to be nominated for Academy Award for Best Picture.
Toy Story 3	2010	First CGI-animated feature to gross $1 Billion dollars.
Oblivion	2013	First-ever use of a virtual production set on a feature film.
Zafari	2018	First television series produced entirely using a game engine (specifically Unreal Engine 4).
Spider-Man: Into the Spider-Verse	2018	First feature film to heavily use machine learning on artist-generated original data to aid production.
The Mandalorian	2019	First usage of a 360-degree LED screen to combine virtual sets with live-action actors.
Avatar: The Way of Water	2022	First use of motion-capture in underwater photography.

=== Format, process and sound ===
Year	Milestone	Work	Notes
1920	Animation produced using a photographic color process	The Debut of Thomas Cat	Using the Brewster Color process.
1923	Synchronized sound animations	N/A	Lee De Forest premiered a program of 18 short films using the Phonofilm sound-on-film process at the Rivoli Theater in New York City.
1928	Fully synchronized sound and post-produced soundtrack	Steamboat Willie	A click track was used to set the same tempo for animation and soundtrack (Mickey Mousing).
1931	Feature-length film with synchronized sound	Peludópolis	Considered lost.
1932	Animation to use the three-strip Technicolor process	Flowers and Trees	
1937	Animation to use Disney's multiplane camera	The Old Mill, short film.	A predecessor of the multiplane technique had already been used for The Adventures of Prince Achmed. Ub Iwerks had developed an early version of the multiplane camera in 1934 for his The Headless Horseman Comicolor Cartoon.
1937	First animated feature film to use three-strip Technicolor	Snow White and the Seven Dwarfs	
1940	Animation to use stereophonic sound	Fantasia	Recorded in Fantasound with 33 microphones on eight channels, but the reproduction of multi-channel Fantasound in theaters was eventually more limited than intended
1951	Stereoscopic 3D animations	Now is the Time & Around is Around	Abstract dual-strip stereoscopic short films by Norman McLaren for the Festival of Britain
1952	Animated feature film presented in 3D	Bwana Devil	
1953	Animation presented in widescreen format	Toot, Whistle, Plunk and Boom	Short film; developed and released in CinemaScope.
1955	Animated feature in widescreen format	Lady and the Tramp	
1957	Animated TV series broadcast in color	Colonel Bleep	
1959	Syncro-Vox in animation	Clutch Cargo	
1960	First animation to use xerography (replacing hand inking)	Goliath II	
1961	Animated feature film to use xerography process	One Hundred and One Dalmatians	
1978	Animated feature presented in VistaVision	Lupin the 3rd: The Mystery of Mamo	Process adapted for animation as "Anime Vision".
1978	Animated feature to be presented in Dolby sound	Watership Down	
1983	3D feature film – stereoscopic technique	Abra Cadabra	
1983	Animated TV series to be recorded in Stereo sound	Inspector Gadget	
1989	TV cartoon to be broadcast in Dolby Surround sound.	Hanna-Barbera's 50th: A Yabba Dabba Doo Celebration	
1995	Animated television series to be broadcast in Dolby Surround	Pinky and the Brain	
2000	Animated feature presented in IMAX	Fantasia 2000	
2007	Animated feature presented in 7.1 surround sound	Ultimate Avengers	Blu-ray release
2008	Animated feature designed, created and released exclusively in 3D	Fly Me to the Moon	
2009	Animated feature directly produced in stereoscopic 3D rather than converted in 3D	Monsters vs. Aliens	Completion using InTru3D
2010	Animated feature released theatrically in 7.1 surround sound	Toy Story 3	
2022	Animated feature film to aspect ratio opened up in IMAX	Lightyear	It opened up from 2.39:1 to 1.43:1 for select sequences of the film.
2024	Animated series with IMAX aspect ratio	Max & the Midknights	Opened from 2.39:1 to 1.43:1 for select sequences.
2024	First animated feature film in 2:1 aspect ratio	Moana 2	

== Reception ==
=== Accolades ===
Year	Milestone	Work	Notes
1933	First animation to win Best Animated Short Film at the Academy Awards	Flowers and Trees	
1938	First animated feature to be nominated an Academy Award	Snow White and the Seven Dwarfs	representing Best Original Score; it also received an Academy Honorary Award for Walt Disney.
1941	First animation to win competitive Academy Awards	Pinocchio	representing Best Original Song and Original Score
1951	First animated feature to win Golden Bear	Cinderella	Each award have genre-specific categories in only a year.
1961	First animated TV series nominated for the Primetime Emmy Award for Outstanding Comedy Series	The Flintstones	As of 2026, no animated series has won.
1989	First animated feature nominated for the Golden Globe Award for Best Motion Picture – Musical or Comedy	The Little Mermaid	It has currently nominated several films until 2006, which lasted The Incredibles in 2004.
1993	First animated feature to win the Golden Globe Award for Best Motion Picture – Musical or Comedy	Beauty and the Beast	It has currently won other two films until 2006, these including The Lion King and Toy Story 2.
1993	First animated feature nominated for the Academy Award for Best Picture	Beauty and the Beast	As of 2026, no animated feature has won.
1994	First animated feature nominated for the Academy Award for Best Visual Effects	The Nightmare Before Christmas	
1998	First animated feature to win Japan Academy Film Prize for Picture of the Year	Princess Mononoke	
2002	First Academy Award for Best Animated Feature winner	Shrek	Monsters, Inc. and Jimmy Neutron: Boy Genius were also nominated.
2005	First animated feature to win Academy Award for Best Sound Editing	The Incredibles	
2009	First animated documentary nominated for the Academy Award for Best International Feature Film	Waltz with Bashir	As of 2026, no animated film has won.
2010	First animated feature nominated for the Metro Manila Film Festival Award for Best Picture	RPG Metanoia	As of 2026, no animated film has won, although received a second runner-up prize instead.
2015	First animated feature to win Venice Film Festival for Grand Jury Prize	Anomalisa	
2022	First animated documentary nominated for the Academy Award for Best Documentary Feature Film	Flee	It also nominated in the Best International Feature and Best Animated Feature categories, becoming the first film ever to be nominated in all three of those categories.
2024	First animated feature to win Gawad Urian for Best Film	Iti Mapukpukaw	

=== Box office records ===
Year	Milestone	Film	Notes
1992	First animated film to gross over $400 million	Snow White and the Seven Dwarfs	gross $418 million
1993	First animated feature to earn $500 million worldwide	Aladdin	gross $504 million
1994	First animated feature to earn $750 million worldwide	The Lion King	gross $768 million
1995	First CGI animated film to gross over $250, $300 million	Toy Story	gross $362 million
1998	First CGI animated film to gross over $363 million	A Bug's Life	
1999	First CGI animated film to gross over $400 million	Toy Story 2	gross $485 million
2001	first CGI animated film to gross over $500 million	Monsters, Inc.	gross $525.4 million
2003	first animated film to gross over $800 million	Finding Nemo	gross $867 million
2004	first animated film to gross over $900 million	Shrek 2	gross $924 million
2010	First animated feature to earn $1 billion worldwide	Toy Story 3	It is currently the highest-grossing G-rated film from 2010 to 2019, only to be surpassed by another sequel, Toy Story 4.
2013	First animated feature to earn $1.25 billion worldwide	Frozen	gross $1.29 billion
2019	First animated feature to earn $1.5 billion worldwide	The Lion King (2019)	Walt Disney Pictures, which produced the film, considered it to be live-action despite the entire film (aside from its opening shot) being computer animated. Other sources deemed it to be animated based on specified criteria. gross $1.66 billion
2020	First non-American animated film to topped the annual global box office	Demon Slayer: Kimetsu no Yaiba – The Movie: Mugen Train	It also the first R-rated animated film to earn $200 to 500 million worldwide, surpassing the previous R-rated film Sausage Party (2016) with $140 million worldwide, which makes Demon Slayer: Mugen Train three times larger than the former in a box-office gross for a R-rated animated film, making it a rare feat. It was the only non-American animated film to top the global box office for five years.
2024	First animated feature film to earn $1.675 billion worldwide	Inside Out 2	Currently the highest-grossing Pixar film of all time as well as the second highest-grossing animated film of all time which was surpassed by Ne Zha 2.
2024	First animated feature film to earn over $200 million at its 5-day opening weekend	Moana 2	It became the highest-grossing animated feature film of its opening weekend by making over $200 million.
2025	First non-Hollywood animated feature film to earn $1 billion worldwide First animated feature film to earn $2 billion worldwide	Ne Zha 2	It earned $2 billion in China and worldwide and is currently the highest-grossing animated feature film of all time.
2025	First R-rated non-American and animated film to gross over $600 million mark	Demon Slayer: Kimetsu no Yaiba – The Movie: Infinity Castle	It also grossed over $700 million mark, surpassing the non-American live-action Detective Chinatown 3.

== Other milestones ==
Year	Milestone	Notes
1924	First pornographic animation	The Virgin with the Hot Pants, opening sequence for a stag film.
1928	Fully pornographic animated film	Eveready Harton in Buried Treasure
1932	First hentai animation	Suzumi-bune; first established with the term hentai, a Japanese animation and literature pornography.
1942	First film to use limited animation extensively	The Dover Boys at Pimento University
1950	First animated TV series	Crusader Rabbit
1960	First primetime animated TV series	The Flintstones
1961	First animation to combine various types	Conversation in Space. combines with collage and paint
1962	First animated Christmas-themed TV special	Mr. Magoo's Christmas Carol
1963	First computer-generated (CGI) moving image	Simulation of a Two-Gyro Gravity-Gradient Attitude Control System by Edward E. Zajac at Bell Labs; animated line drawings for scientific purposes.
1964	First animated feature film based on a TV series	Hey There, It's Yogi Bear!
1964	First stop-motion television special	Rudolph the Red-Nosed Reindeer
1966	First animated Halloween-themed TV special	It's the Great Pumpkin, Charlie Brown
1969	First X-rated animated feature film	A Thousand and One Nights, Japanese anime hit. Pornographic animations had already been made for the phénakisticope and the short film The Virgin with the Hot Pants (c. 1924)
1972	First CGI character	A Computer Animated Hand by Edwin Catmull and Fred Parke at University of Utah
1973	First PG-rated animated film	Fantastic Planet
1973	First use of CGI in a feature film	Westworld; used pixelated image processing to simulate robot vision.
1974	First R-rated animated feature film	The Nine Lives of Fritz the Cat
1976	First CGI short film	Hunger (La Faim)
1978	First animated feature film to premiere on television	Tadhana. It was broadcast once on Philippine channels GMA 7, RPN 9, and IBC 13 to commemorate the sixth anniversary of martial law, and was never released commercially in theaters until 2020s.
1981	First motion capture character	Adam Powers, The Juggler. The character was motion captured by Ken Rosenthal, a real juggler.
1982	First direct-to-video animated feature film	The Wizard of Oz
1983	First direct-to-video animated series and original video animation	Dallos
1985	First PG-13 rated animated film	The Plague Dogs. Released in 1982, theatrically without a rating in the United States; home-video releases instead given a PG-13 rating in 1985, one year after the introduction of that rating.
1985	First 3Danimated film	Starchaser: The Legend of Orin
1986	First non-narrative animated feature film	Sophie's Place
1992	First feature-length animated film released directly to home video in the United States	Tiny Toon Adventures: How I Spent My Vacation
1993	First NC-17 rated animated film	Urotsukidoji: Legend of the Overfiend
1994	First CGI TV series	Insektors
1995	First CGI feature film	Toy Story. Faced challenges over CGI feature films meant to be the first, which includes The Works and Cassiopeia.
1997	First animated series produced for the Internet	The Goddamn George Liquor Program
1997	First CGI TV special	Santa vs. the Snowman
1998	First PG-rated CGI animated film	Antz. The first two CGI films (Toy Story and Cassiopeia) and were G-rated.
2004	First cel-shaded 3D animation	Appleseed
2005	First animated feature film shot with digital still cameras	Corpse Bride. It was shot with Canon EOS-1D Mark II digital SLRs, rather than the 35 mm film cameras used for The Nightmare Before Christmas.
2007	First animated feature film developed by one person	Flatland. Filmmaker Ladd Ehlinger Jr. animated in Lightwave 3D and edited the film by himself over the course of two years, starting in 2005.
2009	Stop-motion character animated using rapid prototyping	Coraline
2012	Stop-motion film to use color 3-D printing technology for models	ParaNorman
2013	First animated TV series solely created by a non-binary person	Steven Universe on Cartoon Network. Created by Rebecca Sugar, also the first woman to solely create a series on that network.
2016	First R-rated 3D computer-animated film	Sausage Party. While most previous R-rated animated films are 2D traditional, Sausage Party is officially recognized as the first R-rated fully CGI to be rated by MPA.
2017	First fully-painted animated feature film	Loving Vincent. 75% of it was animated using paint and brush to canvas in present after van Gogh's death, while the other 25% was also animated using paint and brush through rotoscoping, which only appears in flashbacks.
2024	First animated feature film made completely with AI	DreadClub: Vampire's Verdict. All visuals, performances, sound, music, and animation are AI-generated. July 2024.
2024	First animated feature film converted from planned TV series.	Moana 2; Originally planned as a Disney+ series, converted to film due to the first film's 2023 streaming success.

== See also ==
- Animation
- History of animation
- List of computer-animated films
- List of computer-animated television series
- Timeline of early 3D computer graphics hardware
