= Chico Community Observatory =

Observatory in Chico, California, United States

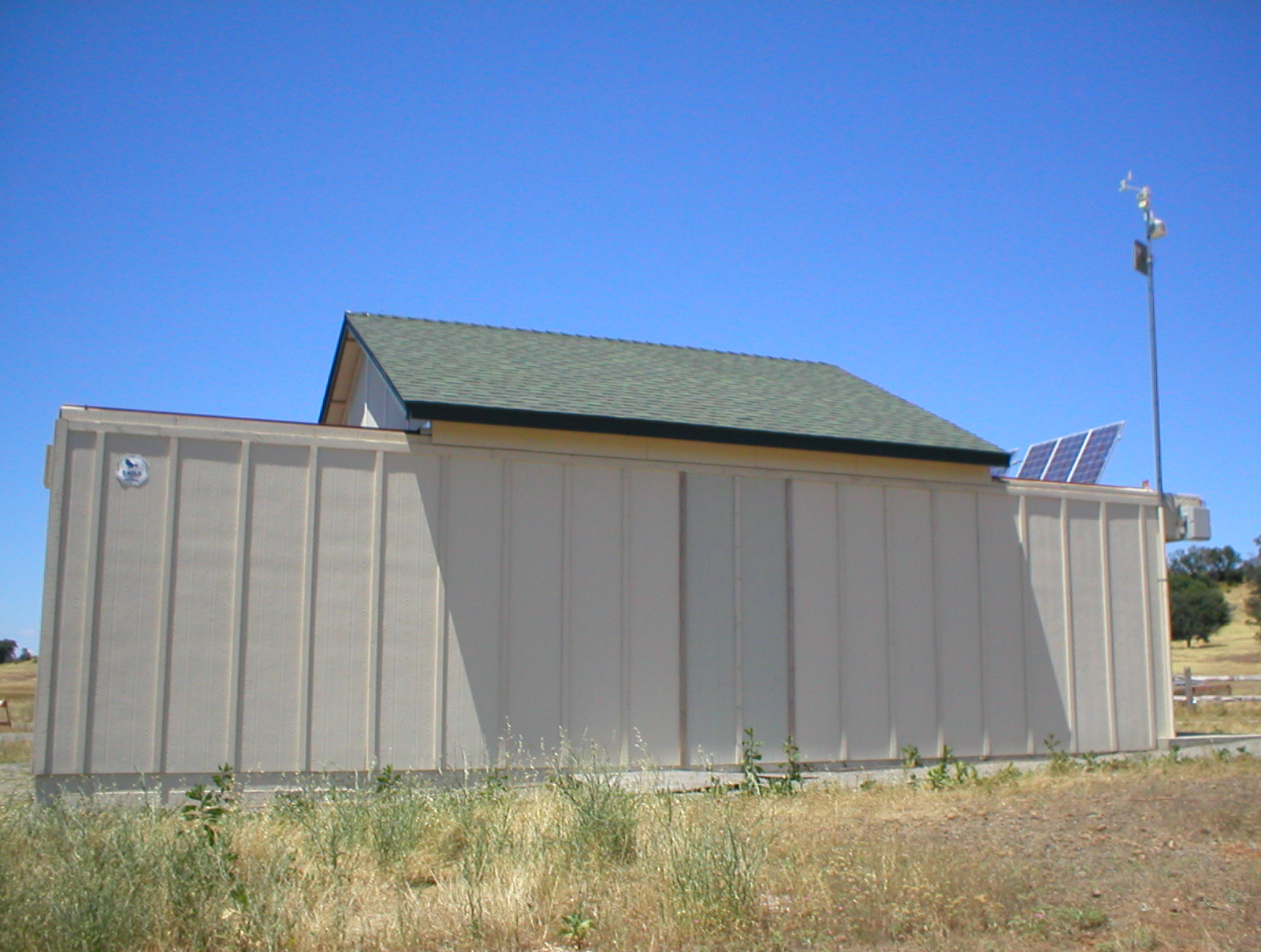
- Outside of the observatory
- Organization: Kiwanis Club of Greater Chico
- Location: Chico, California, United States
- Coordinates: 39.771171°N 121.782745°W
- Established: 2001

Telescopes
- 14-inch SCT: 14-inch SCT
- Related media on Commons

The Chico Community Observatory, also known as the Anita Ingrao Observatory, is a non-profit astronomical observatory owned and operated by Kiwanis Club of Greater Chico. It is located in Chico, California's upper Bidwell Park. Entrance to the observatory is free as the facility operates on donations and volunteers.

== Anita Ingrao ==
Anita Johanna Ingrao was previously co-director of the observatory and was involved as a volunteer since the opening in 2001. She had a passion for teaching children about astronomy. In 2009 she was even invited to the White House to teach kids about science in an event organized by NASA. She also worked on PBS program 400 Years of the Telescope with her fiancé, Kris Koenig as well as Assaulted: Civil Rights Under Fire, Sight: The Story of Vision, and her Los Angeles Area Emmy-winning telecourse Astronomy: Observations and Theories.

In 2014, she died at 51 years old from stage 4 breast cancer and the observatory was named after her. Today, the observatory is directed by Bill Koperwhats.

== Renovations and Theft Issues ==
Because of the facility's reliance on private donations, the observatory has had issues with repairs and replacements of their expensive equipment that has forced the observatory to shut down for months at a time.

=== Solar Panel Theft ===
In 2009, unknown suspects stole three of their six solar panels and damaged the remaining. It was initially believed that the observatory would need to close down until they were able to afford the solar panels which costed about $2,500 each. This issue was quickly resolved within a month of the incident when an anonymous donation made it possible to replace and fix the solar panels and the observatory was up and running again.

=== Closing of Summer 2017 ===
In summer 2017, the observatory closed due to mechanical troubles for an entire year. The observatory needed $8,000 for repairs. Finally, the batteries, air conditioning, and retractable roof were repaired in July 2018, which was made possible by community donations.

== See also ==
- List of observatories
