= Target Earth =

Target Earth may refer to:

- Target Earth (video game), a 1990 video game also known as Assault Suits Leynos
- Target Earth (album), a 2013 album by Voivod
- Target Earth (film), a 1954 science fiction B-movie
- Target Earth, a 1998 TV film starring Christopher Meloni and Marcia Cross
- UFO: Target Earth
- Moontrap: Target Earth
- Target... Earth?, starring Victor Buono
