= Mark Slater (composer) =

British composer

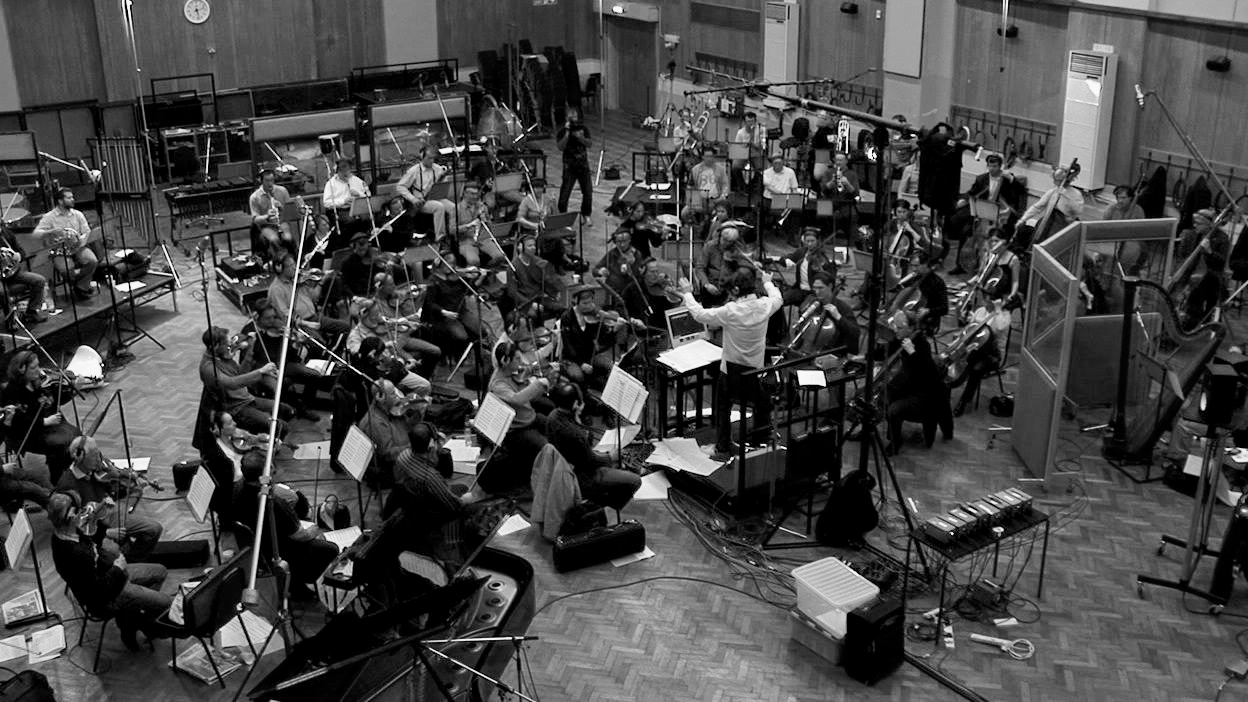
Mark Slater conducting the London Symphony Orchestra at Abbey Road Studios

Mark Andrew Slater (born 1 April 1969) is a British film composer, conductor, cellist and pianist. He is the composer for the film Flatland, 400 Years of the Telescope., and numerous planetarium fulldome films. Slater is a sponsored artist of the Make Art Not War Foundation.

== Early years ==
Slater was born on 1 April 1969 in Reigate, Surrey. His musical background includes a father who is a professor of music and conductor, a degree from the London College of Music and five years as a cathedral chorister at Christ Church Cathedral, Oxford. Slater appeared on Central TV in 1982 as a treble soloist on A Ceremony of Carols filmed as a follow-up to an album issued by ASV Records and on the 1984 Decca release of the Messiah performed by the Academy of Ancient Music. In 1998, Slater made his debut at Dorking Halls, Surrey as a solo pianist performing Rhapsody on a Theme by Paganini. Slater's "crisp" piano playing was compared to Gershwin in a performance of Rhapsody in Blue. A composition by Slater written for a fund raising concert in 1999 for Kosovo War refugees 'Tempus Fugit' made a "stunning impression." Slater appeared in other Surrey concerts as a conductor and organist.

== Recent years ==
In 2006 Slater scored the animated feature film Flatland: The Film directed by Ladd Ehlinger Jr. In 2007 Tribal DDB commissioned Slater to provide a film score for the Philips Aurea Seduction by Light campaign. The project won prestigious industry awards in the Consumer Electronics category including specific awards for music and People's Voice at the 12th Annual 2008 Webby Awards.

In 2008 Slater scored the music for 400 Years of the Telescope, a PBS special for the 2009 International Year of Astronomy, with the London Symphony Orchestra, which garnered Slater a Telly Award. The related fulldome video project, Two Small Pieces of Glass, became the most played planetarium full dome film shown for 3 years in a row. Planetarium Director Andrew Kerr said "it has the most spectacular beginning of any planetarium show", noting the "visceral feeling" created by the score with the visuals. This marked the start of acclaimed soundtracks for the fulldome planetarium world such as Natural Selection (2010), Dinosaurs at Dusk (2013), Edge of Darkness (2015), Mars 1001 (2018).

In 2020, Slater produced music for the Tokyo Olympics VR coverage by COSM Studios and an 8-part VR series for Meta Platforms, Tokyo Origami. The episode "Through the Eyes of an Otaku" won Best Short at the Brno Fulldome Film Festival.

In 2021, Slater collaborated with Argentinian composer Gabriel Lococo on an anti-war concept album about the Falklands War / Guerra de Malvinas: a 10-week undeclared war between Argentina and the United Kingdom in 1982 over the islands. The album, Temas Unidos, was recognized by the legislature of Buenos Aires as Culturally and Socially Significant in 2022.

== Awards ==
- Cannes Cyberlions Grand Prix Shortlist (Seduction by Light)
- Webby Award (Seduction by Light)
- The One Show (Seduction by Light)
- Web Award (Seduction by Light)
- Telly Award (400 Years of the Telescope)
- Imiloa Fulldome Film Festival (Natural Selection)
- Accolade Competition (Saved by Grace)
- European Independent Film Award (Saved by Grace)
- Virgin Spring Cinefest (Saved by Grace)
- Fulldome Festival Brno (Tokyo Origami)

== Works ==
=== Films ===
- Mars 1001 (2018) Mirage 3D
- Edge of Darkness (2015) E&S Digital Theater
- Dinosaurs at Dusk (2013) Mirage 3D
- Solar System Odyssey (2011) Morehead Planetarium & Science Center
- Expedition Green (2010) Hamburg Planetarium
- Urban Scumbags vs Countryside Zombies (2010) MMC Productions
- Natural Selection (2010) Mirage 3D
- Hive Mind (2009) Ladd Ehlinger Jr.
- Two Small Pieces of Glass (2009) Interstellar Studios
- Universal Senses (2008) SKS Films
- Flatland: The Film (2007) Ladd Ehlinger Jr.

=== Documentary ===
- 400 Years of the Telescope (2009) Interstellar Studios
