= Cassiopeia (1996 film) =

1996 animated film directed by Clóvis Veira

- DVD cover for Cassiopeia.
- Directed by: Clóvis Veira
- Written by: Aloisio Castro; José Feliciano; Robin Geld; Clóvis Vieira
- Produced by: Nello de'Rossi
- Starring: Osmar Prado; Jonas Mello; Aldo César; Marcelo Campos; Cassius Romero; Rosa Maria Barolli
- Edited by: Marc de'Rossi
- Music by: Vicente Sálvia
- Production company: NDR Filmes
- Distributed by: PlayArte Pictures (Brazil); Hoyts (Australia)
- Release dates: February 1, 1996 (Brazil); June 21, 1996 (Australia)
- Running time: 80 minutes
- Country: Brazil
- Language: Portuguese
- Budget: US$ 1.5 million

Cassiopeia is a 1996 Brazilian animated feature film, produced by NDR Filmes and released by PlayArte Pictures in Brazil on February 1, 1996. It is an adventure film about the invasion of planet Ateneia by intruders trying to steal their energy.

== Plot ==
The planet Ateneia, located in the constellation of Cassiopeia, is attacked by space invaders who begin to drain its vital energy. A distress signal is sent into outer space by the local astronomer, Liza, and received by four heroes – Chip, Chop, Feel and Thot – who travel across the galaxy to the rescue. The heroes venture through the galaxy facing many dangers as they try to rescue Ateneia. Each has a specific function in their spaceship: Chop is the captain and pilot, Feel and Thot monitor space, and Chip is the gunman, working also as comic relief throughout. Liza is an astronomer in Ateneia's main laboratory, working on all of the scientific details of the planet's life. On the way to defeat the evil forces of Shadowseat, the foursome meet Leonardo, a scientist from an undeveloped planet who creates crazy gadgets.

== Development ==
Production began in 1992 with environment and character modelling and the creation of the script. Animation began in 1993, and the image-generation work was completed in 1995. The soundtrack was finished later that year, and the film was first released in Brazilian cinemas on February 1, 1996.

The film was animated using Crystal Graphics' Topas Animator, running on seventeen 486 DX2–66 computers. The first character model was made on a 20 MHz 386 SX. Cassiopeia's animation team was composed of seven computer animators, three traditional animators (who served as consultants and directors of animation), and some freelancers. Mid-way through production some of the CDs storing the film's animation were stolen, requiring some scenes to be re-animated.

The film was one of the first computer-generated feature films. The earlier Toy Story employed clay models that were later scanned and digitized, while Cassiopeia used only software to create its visuals. The film was released soon after Toy Story.

== Voice cast ==
Actor	Character
Osmar Prado	Leonardo
Jonas Mello	Shadowseat
Marcelo Campos	Chip
Cassius Romero	Chop
Fábio Moura	Feel
Hermes Barolli	Thot
Rosa Maria Barolli	Liza

== See also ==
- List of animated feature-length films
- List of computer-animated films
