= Kris Koenig =

American film director

- Born: Chico, California
- Education: Gilroy High School, Gavilan College,
- Occupations: Film Producer, Screenwriter, Director and Cinematographer
- Known for: Producer, Writer and Director of 400 Years of the Telescopeand Astronomy: Observations and Theories.

Kris Koenig is an American film producer, screenwriter, director and cinematographer known for his roles in the documentaries; 400 Years of the Telescope and Astronomy: Observations and Theories.

== Early life and education ==
Kris Koenig was born in 1962 to Ramon Lee and Inez Koenig. The Father was an Air Force fighter pilot and the family moved around a lot until Kris was in Middle School. Kris graduated from Gilroy High School in 1980. He attended Gavilan College.

== Career ==
Kris Koenig joined the US Coast Guard where he was trained in navigation and visual signaling to serve as a Quartermaster. He attended the US Navy Dive school in Pearl Harbor and earned the rating of SCUBA diver. He later left the US Coast Guard 1985.

Koenig was licensed as a Master of Near Coastal Water (100 ton limit) and PADI Master SCUBA Instructor. He worked as a dive instructor and boat captain at Peter Hughes Dive Bonaire from 1987 -1989. He also worked for Skin Diver Magazine, Petersen Publishing, from 1989 – 1994.

In 2003, Koenig was hired by his future partner Anita Ingrao to work as a consultant on the PBS telecourse Astronomy: Observations and Theories (20 x :30). His role grew to become one of the project producers and writer.

Kris currently produces films under his company Koenig Films, Inc.

== Awards and honors ==
Kris Koenig was awarded two Los Angeles Area Emmys in 2006, one for "Non-news Writing" and one for "Instructional Programming".

Kris has received numerous Telly Awards for his works.

== Selected Filmography ==
Year	Title	Role	Notes
2006	Astronomy: Observations and Theories	Producer, Writer, co-cinematographer	TV Mini-Series documentary (19 Episodes)
2009	400 Years of the Telescope	Producer, Writer, Director	Documentary
2009	Two Small Pieces of Glass	Producer, Writer, Director	Short
2013	Assaulted: Civil Rights Under Fire	Producer, Writer, Director	Documentary
2016	Sight: The Story of Vision	Producer, Writer, Director	Documentary

== Personal life ==
Koenig's longtime partner, Anita Ingrao, died in 2014 from breast cancer. She had been producing "SIGHT: The Story of Vision" with Koenig shortly before her death.

== See also ==
- 400 Years of the Telescope
- Astronomy: Observations and Theories
