= Peter Berkow =

American television and music producer

Peter Berkow is an American television and music producer, journalist and educator. His work includes the PBS series Music Gone Public, which features taped concerts by alternative musicians, as well as the series Astronomy: Observations and Theories, which received a Los Angeles Emmy Award in 2006.

== Work ==
Berkow has produced over 200 shows for PBS, including Music Gone Public, which features videos of live music acts hand-picked by Berkow and his wife Tricia. Performers on the series have included Delhi 2 Dublin, Blame Sally, Frank Vignola, Joe Craven, and Tommy Emmanuel. Prior to Music Gone Public, Berkow produced and filmed interviews for Sierra Center Stage, a music series chronicling live acts that played at the Sierra Nevada Big Room in his native Chico, California.

In addition to his production work, Berkow has been active in journalism and education. He is the creator of the award-winning video series VideoCentral: English, a collection of video interviews of both notable writers and student writers speaking about various aspects of composition, intended to help in writing instruction.

== Awards ==
- Los Angeles Emmy Award for Instructional Programming for producing the series Astronomy: Observations and Theories (2006)
- ITC Award for Outstanding Distance Learning Faculty (2001)

== Personal life ==
Berkow lives in Chico, California with his wife Tricia and teaches writing at Shasta College.
