= Waterloo Festival for Animated Cinema =

Annual international film festival

Coordinates: 43.4520°N 80.4890°W

Poster for the 2006 Waterloo Festival for Animated Cinema

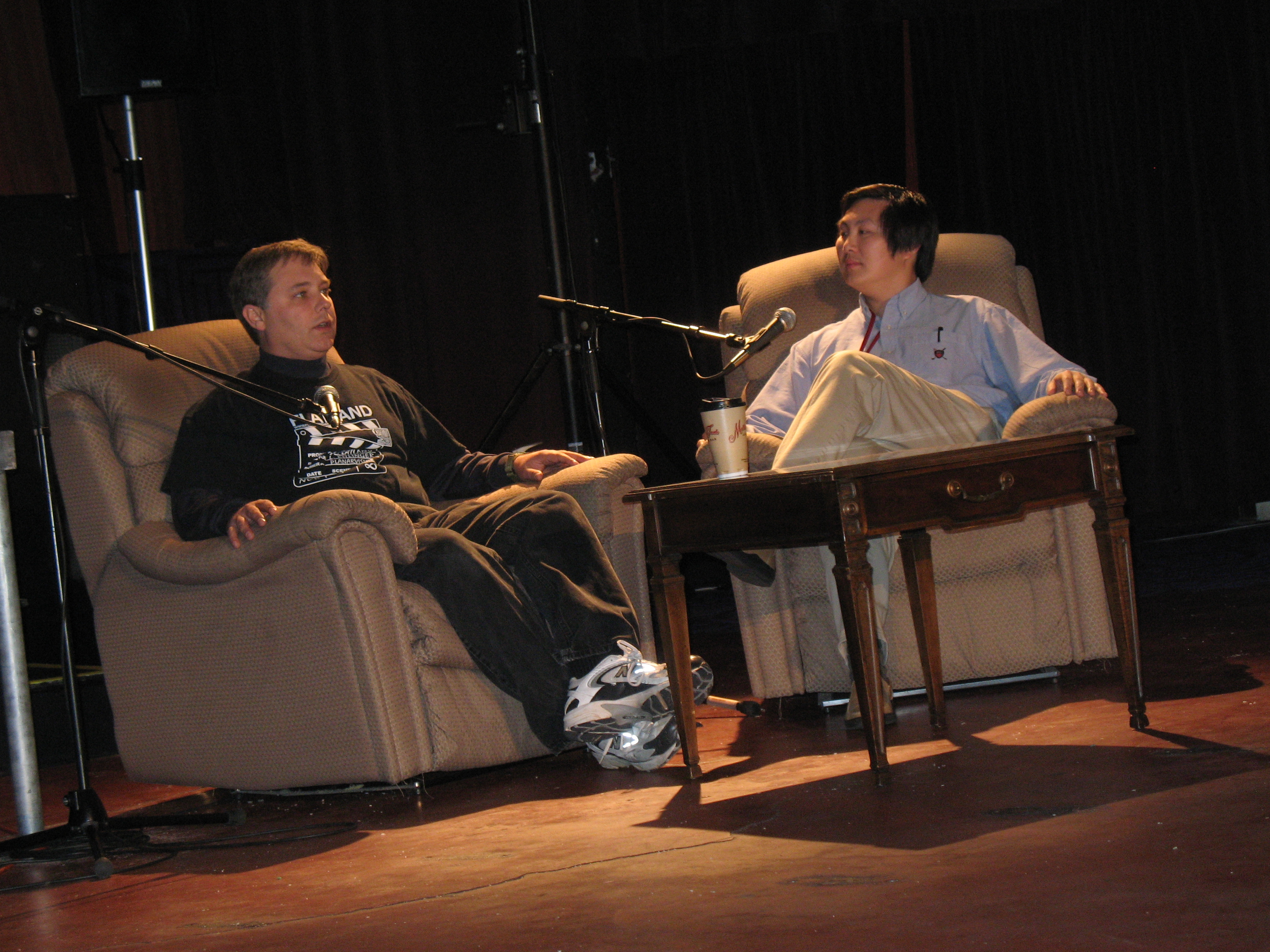
Festival curator Joseph C. Chen (right) talking with director Ladd Ehlinger Jr. about his film Flatland at the 2007 festival.

The Waterloo Festival for Animated Cinema (WFAC) was an annual international film festival for animated feature films, held in Waterloo, Ontario, Canada. It ran for 13 years, from 2001 to 2013.

The festival was founded in 2001 to promote appreciation for animation as a narrative medium for mature cinematic storytelling, and to review and celebrate animated feature films in the venue they were meant to be seen: a theatre.

The festival was unique in its focus on feature animation. Its selection of films suggested a desire to create bridges: from audience to animator, from anime to non-anime, and most obviously from mature audiences to mature films, which simply happen to be animated. The programme was also surprisingly comprehensive - in its first year the festival was dedicated mainly to anime, but it later became much more international. Perhaps reflecting its focus, WFAC has presented more animated feature films in public exhibition than any other festival in the world.

One interesting development since 2003 was the festival's Tidbits programme, developed to search out and promote the creation of feature films by one single artist or very small groups, made possible by advancements in technology.

== See also ==
- List of animated feature-length films
- Ottawa International Animation Festival
