= Music Gone Public =

Music Gone Public is an American public television music program recorded in North America, and broadcast on many Public Broadcasting Service (PBS) stations around the United States. Music Gone Public is distributed by the satellite service NETA. PBS member station KVIE Sacramento is the presenting station.

The series features taped concerts by alternative singers and musicians that are curated by producer Peter Berkow.

== Episodes ==
Season/Episode	Title/Performer
S01E01	Delhi 2 Dublin
S01E02	Frankie Moreno
S01E03	Blame Sally
S01E04	Antsy McClain
S01E05	Nell Robinson & The Rose of No-Man's Land
S01E06	Tom Rigney and Flambeau
S01E07	Frank Vignola: Four Generations of Guitar
S01E08	Roy Rogers & The Delta Rhythm Kings
S01E09	Joe Craven
S01E10	Tommy Emmanuel
