= Nello De Rossi =

Italian-Brazilian actor and restaurateur (1921-2013)

Nello Roberto de Rossi
- Born: May 2, 1921; Rome, Italy
- Died: June 25, 2013 (aged 92); São Paulo, Brazil
- Occupations: Actor, Restaurateur
- Known for: Founder of Nello’s Cantina
- Spouse: Rina de Rossi (d. 2024)

Nello Roberto de Rossi (May 2, 1921 – June 25, 2013) was an Italian-Brazilian actor and restaurateur best known for founding the Nello's Cantina in São Paulo, Brazil.

Before establishing his restaurant, De Rossi had a brief acting career in Italian cinema, working at the Cinecittà Studios.

== Early life and cinema career ==
Nello de Rossi was born in Rome, Italy, on May 2, 1921. He began his career acting in Italian films in the 1930s. He is credited with an appearance in The Little Adventurers (Piccoli naufraghi) (1939) and was an assistant director to Roberto Rossellini, Vittorio de Sica, Aldo Fabrizi and Mario Bonnard.

De Rossi was the producer of Cassiopeia, a 1996 Brazilian animated feature film, produced and released by NDR Filmes in Brazil on April 1, 1996. It is considered one of the earliest CGI animated movies, if not the first one.

De Rossi also produced and directed Jeitosa, Um Assunto Muito Particular (1984) and Festa (1989), which won the Festival de Gramado in 1989.

== Emigration to Brazil ==
In 1954, De Rossi moved to New York City, where he managed a restaurant. In the early 1970s, he relocated to São Paulo, Brazil, with his wife, Rina, and together they opened Nello’s Cantina e Pizzaria in 1974.

== Nello's Cantina ==
In 1974, Nello and his wife Rina founded Nello's Cantina e Pizzaria in the neighborhood of Pinheiros, São Paulo.

Over the years, the cantina was especially recognized for its traditional dishes like lasagna, gnocchi and ossobuco as well as its décor, reminiscent of old Italian taverns.

The restaurant created a division between smokers and non-smokers in the dining room, before the law made this to be mandatory in every restaurant.

== Nello De Rossi's "Bonita Camisa, Fernandinho" ==
In 1984, De Rossi starred in a Brazilian commercial for the clothing brand USTop that featured the now-famous line "Bonita camisa, Fernandinho" ("Nice shirt, Fernandinho").

== Personal life ==
Nello de Rossi was married to Rina de Rossi, who co-founded the restaurant with him. Rina died in June 2024 at the age of 95.

== Death ==
Nello de Rossi died on June 25, 2013, at the age of 92 in São Paulo. His death was reported in Brazilian media.

The cantina remained in operation after his passing. The restaurant remained a family-run establishment, with their children—Massimo, Patricia, Daniela, and Marco—and son-in-law, Augusto Mello, taking roles in its management. A second location was opened in Vila Leopoldina in 2011.

== Awards and legacy ==
In 2005, Nello's Cantina was selected by the Veja Comer & Beber guide as one of the best traditional Italian restaurants in São Paulo.

== Filmography ==
- The Little Adventurers(Piccoli naufraghi) (1939)
- Other minor roles in Italian cinema (1950s)
- Jeitosa, Um Assunto Muito Particular (1984)
- Festa (1989)
- Cassiopeia (1996)

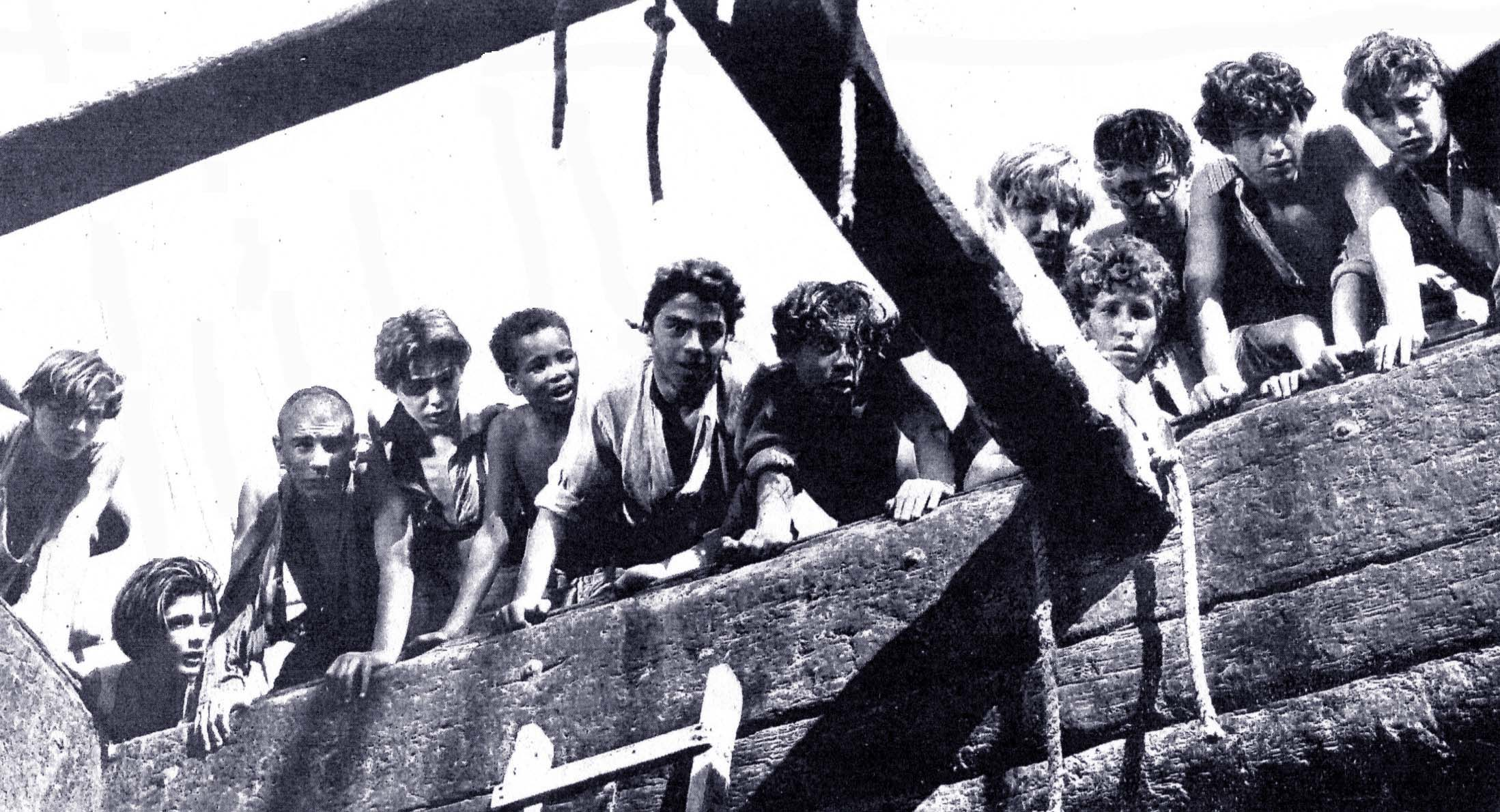
Scene from "Piccoli naufraghi" (1939)
