= Ladd Ehlinger Jr. =

American filmmaker

Ladd Ehlinger Jr. (born August 21, 1968 in New Orleans, Louisiana) is an American filmmaker. He is the director and animator of the 2007 film Flatland as well as a creator of numerous political videos promoting a libertarian conservative viewpoint, some of which have become highly controversial and reached viral levels of publicity. On his website, he compares himself to Sam Peckinpah and Orson Welles. He also hosts a radio talk show in Huntsville, Alabama.

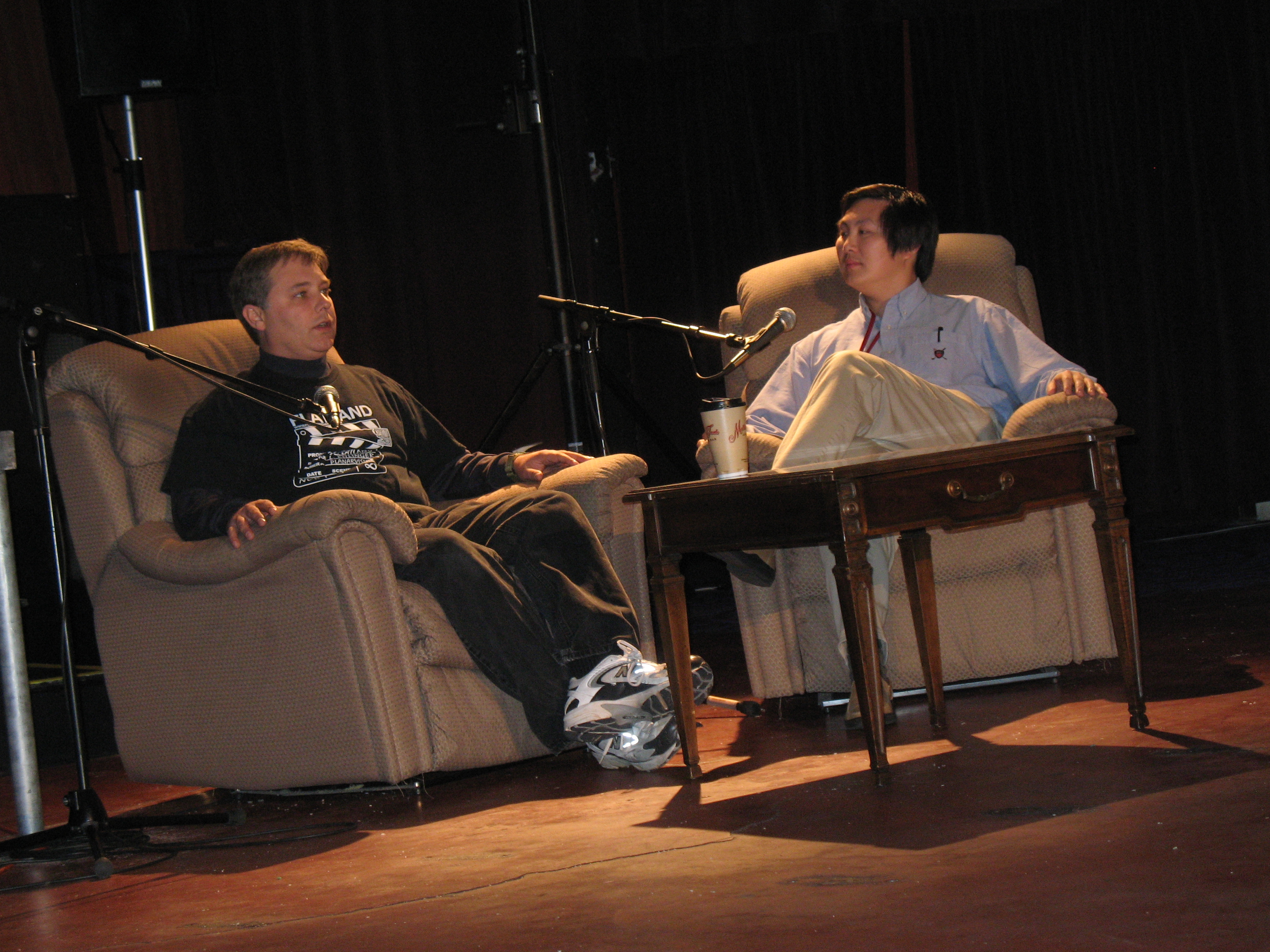
Ladd Ehlinger Jr (left) at the 2007 Waterloo Festival for Animated Cinema, talking about his film Flatland

== Flatland ==
In 2007, Ehlinger directed, animated and edited the film Flatland, which is based on Edwin Abbott Abbott's novella of the same name. The film takes place on a two-dimensional world inhabited by intelligent polygons, most of whom refuse to acknowledge the existence of a third dimension. "The story follows its hero A Square, who inhabits a world that is completely flat and two-dimensional. A mysterious visitor from the third dimension arrives, bent on spreading the gossip about another dimension called height. A Square is taken out of Flatland and transported to the 3D universe. In so doing, the very fabric of space-time itself is placed at risks, potentially destroying all of creation."

"Flatland" was widely reviewed and received critical acclaim as an independent, innovative film.

== Hive Mind ==
In 2010, Ehlinger released another full-length film, more overtly political than the last. This film, Hive Mind, centers on a conservative talk radio host who is the last "normal" human in a world otherwise inhabited entirely by zombies who are part of the "Hive Mind" of the title.

== Political videos ==
Ehlinger has created numerous viral videos, including a video of a dancing Barney Frank between disco balls, an ad portraying Nancy Pelosi as the Wicked Witch of the West an ad promoting Dale Peterson's candidacy for agriculture commissioner in Alabama, and an anti-Janice Hahn ad portraying the congressional candidate with red eyes and as a stripper who gyrates while two black rappers grab dollar bills out of her panties and chant "Give us your cash, bitch". The ad focused on Janice Hahn's promotion of a taxpayer-funded program in Los Angeles that hires convicted felons as "gang intervention specialists", many of whom have been subsequently indicted. This latter ad was described in the media as "the most racist and sexist political ad ever", and Democrats at the state and national level urged Republican candidate Craig Huey to disown the ad, which he eventually did. Ehlinger himself said in response to the criticism, “I didn't kill anyone. I didn't even enable anyone to kill anyone....The ad's funny. It makes me laugh. So if, for some reason, it's pulled by YouTube, a thousand will be launched in its place.” The Democratic Congressional Campaign Committee made mention of the controversy surrounding the ad in one of its fundraising e-mails.
