= Adam Powers, The Juggler =

Computer-generated character

A screenshot from the video

Adam Powers, The Juggler (also known as The Juggler) is a 1981 computer animation created by Richard Taylor and Gary Demos and released by Information International Inc. (Triple I). It was one of the earliest CGI-animated anthropomorphic characters ever. The character was motion captured from Ken Rosenthal, a real juggler.

== Premise ==
The film opens with a juggler juggling a pack of shapes (circle, square, cones, etc.) and showing the computer animation film the shapes and objects around the scene. As the version included in the DVDs and Blu-rays bonus material is taken straight from one of the company's demo reels, a Mercedes-Benz logo is seen inside the green ball, which was not in the original short film. The film ends with the juggler vanishing the scene.
