= The Virgin with the Hot Pants =

1924 film

- Release date: 1924
- Running time: 1 minute, 50 seconds
- Country: United States
- Language: Silent (English intertitles)

The Virgin with the Hot Pants is a 1924 American stag film. Danuta Zadworna-Fjellestad and film scholar Linda Williams put the production date of this film at 1923–1924. It is the first known pornographic film to use animated cartoons.

== Plot ==
The opening scenes of The Virgin with the Hot Pants are animation. The first animation shows a cartoon penis and two testes pursuing a cartoon woman inside a room. After a while, as the woman is hanging from a chandelier, the penis penetrates her vagina. In the next animation, a cartoon mouse is shown putting its very large penis into the vagina of a cartoon cat. From this point, the film shows live action. Various sequences are shown depicting naked women engaged in a variety of acts such as dancing, kissing, and masturbating with a dildo, a male hand spreading out a woman's labia, a woman showing her vulva, a scene of cunnilingus, and a scene of insertion of a beer bottle inside a woman's vagina. In the last sequence, a man and a woman are shown stripping. The woman then sits over the penis of the seated man, and they have sex.

== Analysis ==
Williams dubbed Virgin as "primitivism with a vengeance". According to her, the film exemplifies what she describes as "primitive depths of crude body show". She notes that the Kinsey Institute for Research in Sex, Gender, and Reproduction has labelled the film as a "potpourri". Williams classifies Virgin into a group of stags characterized by a lack of narrative. In this group of stags, according to her, scenes of dissimilar sexual acts are arranged into a single film reel. Lacking a narrative and a title character, Virgin is composed of close-ups of genitals.
