= Conversation in Space =

- Opening title
- Directed by: Rodolfo Paras-Perez
- Produced by: Rodolfo Paras-Perez
- Cinematography: Rodolfo Paras-Perez
- Edited by: Rodolfo Paras-Perez
- Release date: 1961
- Running time: 2 minutes and 48 seconds
- Country: Philippines
- Language: Silent

Conversation in Space is a 1961 Philippine experimental abstract animated short film directed by Rodolfo "Rody" Paras-Perez, an UP-alumnus. Developed as Perez's thesis film under commission of University of Minnesota, it has no plot and dialogue entirely that illustrates with vivid and captivating abstract animation using collage and paint.

== Release ==
Despite having completed in 1961, Conversation in Space was screened at the first film festival held in Manila on 1971.

== Legacy ==
Conversation in Space is arguably the first non-commercial animation (Note: Although in some articles said "animation" is primarily used as "advertisement" or "commercial" in the 1950s, Larry Alcala did a short black-and-white animation on 8mm film at one point but never re-discovered.) as well as one of the earliest experimental films from the Philippines, with its animations expand audience's perspectives of Southeast Asian modern and contemporary art.

In 2018, the film was screened at National Gallery Singapore’s ‘Painting with Light,’ an annual festival of international films on art, making it the earliest animation short film in the Philippines to be rediscovered.
