= CrystalGraphics =

- Founded: 1986; 40 years ago
- Founder: Dennis Ricks
- Headquarters: Santa Clara, California, U.S
- Website: crystalgraphics.com

CrystalGraphics is the developer of the PowerPoint sharing website PowerShow.com, as well as templates and plug-ins for PowerPoint and Office products. Some of CrystalGraphics' products include PowerPoint templates, 2D and 3D special-effects, video backgrounds, charting, animations and other add-ons. The company was founded by Dennis Ricks in 1986 and is based in Santa Clara, California. The company was the first company to introduce 3D transitions for PowerPoint.

== TOPAS ==
AT&T/Crystal TOPAS was a pioneering 3D computer graphics software package for x86-based personal computers. It was a fully integrated 3D modeling, rendering, and animation package. It included texture mapping tools and tools to easily integrate 3D artwork with photographic backgrounds and digital images.
