= 400 Years of the Telescope =

- Directed by: Kris Koenig
- Written by: Donald Goldsmith; Albert van Helden; Kris Koenig
- Produced by: Kris Koenig; Dan Koehler
- Narrated by: Neil deGrasse Tyson
- Cinematography: Scott Stender
- Edited by: Kimberly Generous White
- Music by: Mark Slater
- Production company: Interstellar Media Productions
- Distributed by: PBS
- Release date: January 6, 2009
- Running time: 60 minutes
- Country: United States
- Language: English

400 Years of the Telescope: A Journey of Science, Technology and Thought is a 2009 American documentary film that was created to coincide with the International Year of Astronomy in 2009. Directed by Kris Koenig, it chronicles the history of the telescope from the time of Galileo and features interviews with leading astrophysicists and cosmologists from around the world, who explain concepts ranging from Galileo's first use of the telescope to view the moons of Jupiter, to the latest discoveries in space, including new ideas about life on other planets and dark energy, a mysterious vacuum energy that is accelerating the expansion of the universe.

== Cast ==
=== Actors ===
- Han Beekman
- Mavt Steketee
- Stefano Lecci
- Herman Boerman
- Irma Hartog
- Hallam Murray
- Nils Koenig
- Madison Royal

Galileo voices

- Stefano Lecci
- Francesca Giannini

== Production ==
The film's development team included Donald Goldsmith, a well-known astronomy writer on the Carl Sagan Cosmos team, and Albert Van Helden, a leading authority on the history of the telescope. It was shot on RED Digital Cinema at the world's leading universities and observatories including the European Southern Observatory, Institute for Astronomy, SETI Institute, Space Telescope Science Institute, Anglo-Australian Observatory, and Harvard University. Among the production team's challenges were shooting the Atacama Large Millimeter Array (ALMA) at 5000m on the Atacama Desert. The original score was composed by Mark Slater and recorded by the London Symphony Orchestra at Abbey Road Studios.

== Broadcast and release details ==
- 400 Years of the Telescope premiered at the 213th meetings of the American Astronomical Society (AAS) in Long Beach, California, on January 6, 2009.
- The film was later shown to a national audience by the Public Broadcasting Service (PBS) on April 10, 2009.
- It was selected for screening at several film festivals in 2009, including the Jacksonville Film Festival in Jacksonville, Florida and the Urban Suburban Film Festival in Philadelphia.

== Awards ==
30th Annual Telly Awards

- Silver - Excellent achievement in videography/cinematography
- Bronze (3) - Outstanding achievement in use of animation, copywriting and the documentary over all

SCINEMA 2009

- Best Director

2009 W3 Awards

- Silver Winner: Website Design (Michael Moretti)
