= Flatland (2007 Ehlinger film) =

- Promotional film poster
- Directed by: Ladd Ehlinger Jr.
- Written by: Tom Whalen
- Based on: Flatland: A Romance of Many Dimensions by Edwin A. Abbott
- Produced by: F.X. Vitolo
- Starring: Chris Carter; Megan Colleen; Ladd Ehlinger Jr.
- Edited by: Ladd Ehlinger Jr
- Music by: Mark Slater
- Production company: Flatland Productions
- Distributed by: FilmLadd; Flatland Productions
- Release date: January 14, 2007
- Running time: 95 minutes
- Country: United States
- Language: English

Flatland (also released as Flatland: The Film and Flatland the film) is a 2007 American animated science fiction film based on the 1884 novella Flatland: A Romance of Many Dimensions by Edwin Abbott Abbott. The film was directed and animated by Ladd Ehlinger Jr. in Lightwave 3D. The screenplay was written by author Tom Whalen. The music was composed by Mark Slater.

== Plot ==
External videos
- Flatland The Film: Official HD Version @FilmLadd – Official upload of the movie on YouTube

In a two-dimensional world called Flatland populated by sapient polygons, it is three days until the celebration of the year 3000. "A Square", attorney at law, struggles to instruct his son, A Hexagon, in the art of sight recognition. The lesson is interrupted by A Square's brother B, a clerk to President Circle, warning A to stay home during a meeting at the Senate of the Great Southern Republic.

The Senate session has been called to discuss the increasing hostilities between the government and the Chromatist movement, led by Senator Chromatistes, which seeks the legalization of Flatlanders coloring themselves as they wish. The Great Southern Republic distinguishes itself from its enemy, the Northern Kingdom, by its stances on Chromatism and Irregulars along with a democratic government. Relaxing the laws has already been perceived as weakness by the Northern Kingdom who are massing on the borders.

Against his brother's warning, A Square meets his new client, the first female charged as a Chromatist. On his way home he is caught in the melee leaving the Senate. President Circle's soldiers killed Senator Chromatistes and his supporters, sparking a riot across the city. A Square just gets home safely, then barricades his family against the chaos for the night.

A Square awakens to learn that the deadly riots originated in the Senate meeting that B Square was attending. He scours the city, now under martial law, seeking B Square. The family prepares for another night, only to be terrified by the sudden appearance of A Sphere, CEO of Messiah, Inc, who has chosen A Square to convince Flatland about the existence of the three-dimensional Spaceland. A Sphere plucks A Square out of Flatland, finally making him understand the third dimension. Having business himself at the Great Hall, A Sphere brings A Square to look for his brother there. On their arrival, A Sphere expounds upon three dimensions to President Circle and the Priests, who anticipated this event. After rejecting A Sphere's message and attempting to kill him, the Flatland leaders execute all who have witnessed the event, except B Square, who is imprisoned for life on pain of death in exchange for his silence.

Realizing that time in Spaceland is short, at least for A Square, A Sphere brings him to Messiah, Inc. to finish his education on the gospel of Three Dimensions. Enthralled by the complex world of Spaceland, A Square posits about the existence of even higher dimensions, which A Sphere dismisses. Meanwhile, A Square's intrusion into Spaceland has become a national emergency, which prompts the Spaceland Senate to call to him to appear for a hearing, to explain this breach of protocol of bringing a Flatlander into their midst. They claim that it will be viewed as an act of, and provocation for, war by their enemies, the X-Axis.

A Square learns that the X-Axis wants to destroy Flatland as they consider it an abomination, contrary to the beliefs of the Great Senate. As the debate rages, an ailing A Square tries to explain his theory of multiple dimensions to an unsympathetic crowd. Air-raid sirens wail as A Square collapses from the overwhelming effects of gravity on his two-dimensional body and chaos ensues.

A Sphere manages to send A Square back to Flatland as Messiah, Inc. is bombarded by the X-Axis, with A Sphere killed in the chaos. A Square wakes up on his bed and learns that preaching about a third dimension is illegal now. He finds B Square jailed and explains Spaceland to him, but fearing execution, B Square knocks A Square unconscious. Arriving home, A Square informs his wife that they are going to defect to the Northern Kingdom where he might be able to spread the gospel to a more open-minded populace. Soldiers arrive and A Square escapes with the help of Frau A Square's "war cry" that stuns them. Before he can reach the border, A Square is cornered by the soldiers whose attempt to kill him is thwarted by the Northern Kingdom army's attack. In the fracas, Flatland itself begins to disappear, until a voice welcomes A Square into another dimension.

== Cast ==
Actor	Character	Dimensional shape	Role
Simon G. Hammond	A Sphere	sphere	The CEO of Messiah, Inc. and a resident of Spaceland.
Greg Trent	President Circle	circle	The president of the Southern Republic of Flatland.
Chris Carter	The King of Lineland	line	The ruler of Lineland and the longest line in Lineland (which is only "Six Inches of Space").
Linda Meigs	Mathilde & Millicent	pyramids	A Sphere's secretaries.
Jon Shoemaker	Soldier Y	triangle	A lethal triangle soldier in the Southern Republic Army.
Ashley Blackwell	A Line	slim rectangle	An accused Chromatist female.
Michael Karle	The Pentagon Doctor	pentagon	The chief doctor at the Hospital of Reconfiguration.
Dr. Jeff Sanders	Cube Carlton	cube	One of A Sphere's many workers.
Oscar Gutierrez	The Crazy Old Trapezoid	trapezoid	An elderly, demented trapezoid.
Ladd Ehlinger Jr.	A Square	square	The main character; is a defense attorney and the chosen apostle to preach the Gospel of the Third Dimension.
Karen Ehlinger	Frau A Square	slim rectangle	A Square's wife.
Megan Ehlinger	A Hexagon	hexagon	A Square's youngest son.
Robert Ehlinger	B Square	square	President Circle's personal assistant and A Square's brother.
Catherine Ehlinger	Frau B Square	slim rectangle	B Square's wife.

=== Other voices ===
- Denise Carter
- Juliana Carter
- Mark Carter
- Jacqueline Clift
- Colin Duckworth
- Corin Ehlinger
- Perrin Ehlinger
- Raven Hood
- Chris Kolb
- Lauren Meigs
- Matthew Meigs
- Lacon Mitchell
- Jorge J. Raub
- Sean C. Spurlock
- Bill Wells

== Production ==
Ehlinger recorded dialogue for the film throughout 2005 in his home studio. Using off-the-shelf 3D animation software packages such as Lightwave 3D, Adobe After Effects and others, Ehlinger animated and edited the film by himself over the course of two years, starting in 2005. He sent completed animations to composer Mark Slater for scoring, who sent back audio files.

== Reception ==
Most reviews were positive with specific criticisms, with one quite negative exception. At SciFi.com, Paul Di Filippo gave the film a rating of "A", stating that it "entertains, enlightens and educates", and that "Ehlinger manages to retain the Victorian satire on pomposity and cultural blindness while updating it to modern conditions. And ... [its] conceptual breakthrough is brilliantly handled." Di Filippo's single criticism was that the superimposed text exposition got "a bit heavy-handed". Film Threat reviewer Phil Hall referred to the film's "bold originality and vibrant intelligence", stating, "Sequences throb with raw power, provoking visceral emotional responses". Hall flatly called it "a work of genius," and gave it five stars (of five).

Dennis Schwartz (Ozus' World) gave Flatland an "A", referring to it as "smart, without being cheeky", in taking the likely unfilmable source material, and creating a "spirited avant-garde" film. He summarized:

"...there's not a single thing about it that's disingenuous or unworldly or superficial. It's by a serious and gifted filmmaker who brings a light touch to his craft and does it without an ounce of pretentiousness or Hollywood phoniness or a sense of self-consciousness."

Scott Green at Ain't it Cool News called it "captivating", "an enjoyable mental amusement park ride", and "something amazingly different and intriguing to watch". But he noted, "the complexity of the world being explored does not coherently coalesce", and that the film attacks divisive topics "with an undisciplined flurry of jabs". Green was intrigued by the film's "glib omniscient" title cards, writing that their presence "almost makes for a character in and of itself."

Aylish Wood, reviewing in Science Fiction Film and Television, described the intertitles as fine for children, but "annoying" for adults, and found the math exposition to be "painless" but "a touch too long". She found that too many plot threads were not tied up, and an "overabundance of possible meanings", for example a "slew of referencing" around the character of Senator Chromatistes, which "disperses our understanding". Wood noted flaws in pacing and the intertitles, but found the expression of emotion via color and music to be "effective". Ultimately the film was "a mixed feast" with frustrating "cluttered logic".

Carl Schroeder wrote in The Global Intelligencer that the film is one of "two of the best movie versions ever made" of the story. He states that the film "preserves the biting social satire of the original story with ideas and abstract violence (bleeding polygons) not appropriate for little kids (teens will be fine)". He continues, the "film touches on current events, including allusions to the Iraq war and anti-gay prejudice, to conclude apocalyptically (the book just ends with the protagonist in prison). Most adults will want to see both Flatland versions, sooner or later."

Dan Schneider of Blogcritics gave an overall negative review. He criticized the departures by the film from Abbott's book, such as the character of the king instead being a president (who wears a crown), and the divergence into satire when A Sphere visits A Square, where the sphere is a CEO, instead of Abbott's "mystical guide". Schneider points out that where A Square's experience was originally religious, the film makes it a "wow moment used to lead into some cheap gags", and states that "the story dissolves". He found the film's satire "predictable", and described it as "best when sticking to the book's original points". Schneider faults writer Tom Whalen's script for changing Abbott's story "too much", the music by Mark Slater as "sometimes apt", but at other times "a mess", the intertitle cards as "annoying", the ending for being "muddled" and trying "too hard for the relevance of 2001: A Space Odyssey", and the DVD itself for lacking a commentary track.

In Mathematics in Popular Culture, Lila Marz Harper described the film as "more radical" than Flatland: The Movie, showing more biological detail, and even dreams. She remarked that the film "vividly mimics" Abbott's description of the physical remolding of children's bodies to conform to societal norms, and "adheres closely" to the discrimination against women in Abbott's story. She noted that some variations from the book were confusing: one of A Square's sons is a hexagon, unlike the all-pentagon siblings in Abbott's story.
