= Astronomy: Observations and Theories =

2005 documentary television series

Astronomy: Observations and Theories is a documentary television series that aired for one season from 2005 to 2006. It consists of twenty 28-minute episodes which are also called lessons and are most often viewed on college-run public television stations.

The series was directed by Peter Berkow, co-produced by Peter Berkow and Kris Koenig, with Laurie Melby and Dan Jones serving as Executive Producers and Steve Chollet as associate producer. The executive production company was Coast Learning Systems and is affiliated with Coastline Community College. The series was developed under the supervision of a National Academic Advisory team representing community colleges and universities all over the United States. Cinematographers include Anita Berkow and Kris Koenig. Film editing by Steve Chollet and Bruce Coykendall, and series writing credits go to Kris Koenig. Original music for Astronomy: Observations and Theories is by Scott Dugdale of WaveGroup Sound.

== Episode list and summaries ==
1. The Study of the Universe – The first episode introduces viewers to galaxies, superclusters, stars, and planets that will be discussed in future shows.
2. Observing the Sky – Explains the concept of a 'scientific model' to help describe a celestial sphere and to organize the night sky. The naming of stars and constellations by different cultures is discussed.
3. Celestial Cycles – Looks at the motion, size, and cycles of the Sun, Moon, and Earth, and covers the prediction of solar eclipses.
4. The Birth of Astronomy – Presents the foundations, theories, observations, and contributors to Astronomy.
5. Astronomical Tools – Astronomers do two main things, collect light and analyze it. This chapter answers two questions: what is light, and what tools are used to collect it?
6. The Science of Starlight – Presents the stellar classification system along with the interactions of atoms and light and history of the spectral classes.
7. The Sun: Our Star – Discusses the Sun's interior layers, atmosphere, magnetic cycle, and its effects on Earth.
8. The Family of Stars – Shows viewers how to find distance to nearby stars and how to plot them on an HR diagram, based on the principle that the brightness of a star is determined by its distance from Earth.
9. Stellar Births – Examines the birth of stars in the process of stellar evolution and looks at different types of nebulae and the ingredients needed to produce a star.
10. Stellar Deaths – Details the life and death of stars and the products that are leftover after a star dies.
11. Stellar Remnants – Discusses neutron stars and black holes, remnants after a star's death. Also discusses highly energetic objects, gamma-ray bursts and hypernovae.
12. Our Galaxy: The Milky Way – Talks about the history, size, and anatomy of our galaxy, the Milky Way.
13. Galaxies – Introduces Hubble Law and discussions of the classification of galaxies.
14. Active Galaxies – Continues the discussion of galaxies, introducing the concept of active galaxies.
15. Cosmology – Introduces cosmology, the study of the origin and fate of the universe, and discusses the Big Bang theory.
16. Solar Systems – Discusses solar systems and how they are formed. Includes topics such as the solar nebula theory and the detection of far away planets through the use of Doppler spectroscopy.
17. The Terrestrial Planets – Details The formation and evolution of the Earth compared to other terrestrial planets.
18. The Jovian Worlds – Provides an explanation of the processes that allowed the gas giants in the Solar System to grow to such large sizes. It also discusses gravity, volcanic activity, and atmosphere
19. Solar System Debris – Examines Solar System debris, meteorites, asteroids, and comets.
20. The Search for Life Beyond – Discusses the possibility that the early seeds of life on Earth were delivered by comet impacts and the reasons why it is believed that the first life began on the deep seafloor near hydrothermal vents.
