= UFO: Target Earth =

- Directed by: Michael A. DeGaetano
- Written by: Michael A. DeGaetano
- Produced by: Michael A. DeGaetano (producer); Thomas H. Tolbert (assistant producer)
- Starring: See below
- Cinematography: Jerry Crowder
- Release date: 1974
- Running time: 80 minutes (US)
- Country: United States
- Language: English
- Budget: $70,000
- Box office: $350,000

UFO: Target Earth (also known as Target Earth) is a 1974 American film directed by Michael A. DeGaetano.

== Plot summary ==
The film opens with "'eyewitness accounts' recounting incredible UFO sightings and abductions", according to sci-fi scholar Howard Hughes. The story follows an electronics expert (Alan Grimes) who picks up strange signals: he then finds the signals are coming from a rural section in his area, and tries to find out if this is the start of an invasion from space. He enlists the help of a psychic "sensitive" (Vivian), and two fellow university computer electronics experts (Dr. Mansfield and Dan Rivers), and together they trace the source to a location somewhere beneath the surface of a lake. The alien presence discloses itself to Alan as formless energy trapped there 1000 years by the fears of humans, which impose shapes on them. Alan is the source of the energy they need to return. All he has to do is set aside his fears and die. They tell him that in the whole history of the human race only three had ascended and now he will be the fourth to ascend. Alan rapidly ages, walks into the lake, fights off Dan's attempts to restrain him, and dies. Dan frantically pulls Alan's skeletal remains back onto the shore, the energy pattern departs into space, and the screen displays a quote from Revelations 5.9.

== Cast ==
- Nick Plakias as Alan Grimes
- Cynthia Cline as Vivian
- LaVerne Light as Dr. Mansfield
- Tom Arcuragi as Dan Rivers
- Phil Erickson as Dr. Whitham
- Brooks Clift as Gen. David Gallagher
- Martha Corrigan as Woman on Veranda
- Kathleen Long as Planetarium Receptionist
- Billy Crane as Alan
- Tom Harper as Interviewer
- Ed Lynch as University Professor
- Ida Agree as Housewife
- Luann McMann as Farm Couple
- George Lafia as Farm Couple
- Johnny Baker as Rancher
- Sam Durrance as Rancher

== Locations ==
The film was shot in and around Atlanta, Georgia. Locations include Fernbank Science Center, Manuel's Tavern and Stone Mountain State Park.

== Release ==
UFO: Target Earth grossed $350,000 against a $70,000 budget.

== Later releases ==
The film was released on VHS on 12 June 1989. It is also available on the internet, and on DVD (in two different cuts).

== Soundtrack ==
The soundtrack featured electronic music plus the song "Between the Ceiling and the Sky" by the group Eclipse.

== Reception ==
Howard Hughes commented that "the movie is so cheap as to be oddly unsettling". Hughes remarks that the "plot makes no sense whatsoever".

== See also ==
- List of American films of 1974
