= List of members of the National Academy of Engineering (computer science) =

This list is a subsection of the List of members of the National Academy of Engineering, which includes members and international members of the United States National Academy of Engineering, living and deceased, each affiliated with one of the academy's disciplinary sections. Members are listed under their primary section, and each entry gives the person's name, primary institution, and election year. For deceased members, the year of death is noted.

== Computer Science and Engineering ==
Name	Institution	Year elected
Martín Abadi	Google	2018
Alex Acero	Zoom Communications	2025
Leonard M. Adleman	University of Southern California	1996
Anant Agarwal	edX	2013
Rakesh Agrawal	Data Insights Laboratories	2006
Alfred V. Aho	Columbia University	1999
Anastasia Ailamaki	Ecole Polytechnique Federale de Lausanne	2026
Kurt Akeley	Oak Ridge National Laboratory	2005
Frances E. Allen (died 2020)	IBM Thomas J. Watson Research Center	1987
Paul G. Allen (died 2018)	Vulcan Inc.	2005
Virgilio A. F. Almeida	Federal University of Minas Gerais	2025
Gene Myron Amdahl (died 2015)	Commercial Data Servers, Inc.	1967
Arthur G. Anderson (died 2021)	International Business Machines Corporation	1975
Thomas E. Anderson	University of Washington	2016
John A. Armstrong	International Business Machines Corporation	1987
Chieko Asakawa	International Business Machines Corporation	2017
Bishnu S. Atal	University of Washington	1987
Marc A. Auslander	IBM Thomas J. Watson Research Center	1996
John Backus (died 2007)	IBM Almaden Research Center	1977
Paramvir Bahl	Microsoft Research	2025
Ruzena K. Bajcsy	University of Pennsylvania	1997
James Karl Baker	University of Central Florida	2014
Hari Balakrishnan	Massachusetts Institute of Technology	2015
Paul Baran (died 2011)	NovoVentures, Inc.	1996
Luiz André Barroso (died 2023)	Google	2021
Regina Barzilay	Massachusetts Institute of Technology	2023
Forest Baskett	New Enterprise Associates	1994
George A. Bekey (died 2024)	University of Southern California	1989
C. Gordon Bell (died 2024)	Microsoft Research	1977
Steven M. Bellovin	Columbia University	2001
Marc R. Benioff	Salesforce	2019
Marsha J. Berger	Flatiron Institute	2005
Elwyn Berlekamp (died 2019)	Elwyn & Jennifer Berlekamp Foundation	1977
Timothy Berners-Lee	Massachusetts Institute of Technology	2007
Philip A. Bernstein	Microsoft Corporation	2003
Thomas A. Berson	Salesforce	2020
Joel S. Birnbaum	Hewlett-Packard Company	1989
Donald L. Bitzer (died 2024)	North Carolina State University	1974
Gerrit A. Blaauw (died 2018)	University of Twente	1998
Michael Julian Black	Epic Games	2026
James F. Blinn	Retired-Other	2000
Erich Bloch (died 2016)	The Advisory Group at Huron	1980
Manuel Blum	Carnegie Mellon University	2006
Barry W. Boehm (died 2022)	University of Southern California	1996
Dan Boneh	Stanford University	2016
John Michael Brady	Perspectum	2026
Lewis M. Branscomb (died 2023)	University of California, San Diego	1974
Eric A. Brewer	University of California, Berkeley	2007
Daniel S. Bricklin	Software Garden, Inc.	2003
Sergey Brin	Google	2009
Andrei Z. Broder	Google	2010
Frederick P. Brooks Jr. (died 2022)	University of North Carolina at Chapel Hill	1976
Rodney A. Brooks	Massachusetts Institute of Technology	2004
Randal E. Bryant	Carnegie Mellon University	2003
Douglas Christopher Burger	Microsoft Research	2026
Michael Burrows	Google	2023
Jeffrey P. Buzen	Independent Consultant	2003
Pei Cao	YouTube	2025
Stuart K. Card	Stanford University	2007
Michael J Carey	University of California, Irvine	2002
Edwin E. Catmull	Walt Disney and Pixar Animation Studios	2000
Vinton G. Cerf	Google	1995
Donald D. Chamberlin	IBM Almaden Research Center	1997
Carl C. Chambers (died 1987)	University of Pennsylvania	1970
Tony F. Chan	University of California, Los Angeles	2014
Natarajan Chandrasekaran	Tata Sons Private, Ltd.	2022
K. Mani Chandy	California Institute of Technology	1995
Surajit Chaudhuri	Microsoft Corporation	2024
Steve S. Chen	Information SuperGrid Technology Inc.	1991
Lili Cheng	Microsoft Corporation	2021
David D. Clark	Massachusetts Institute of Technology	1996
James H. Clark	No Affiliation	1998
Wesley A. Clark (died 2016)	Clark, Rockoff and Associates	1999
Edmund M. Clarke (died 2020)	Carnegie Mellon University	2005
John Cocke (died 2002)	IBM Thomas J. Watson Research Center	1979
Edgar F. Codd (died 2003)	Independent Consultant	1981
Danny Cohen (died 2019)	Oracle	2006
Arthur A. Collins (died 1987)	Arthur A. Collins Inc.	1968
Robert P. Colwell	Defense Advanced Research Projects Agency	2006
Dorin Comaniciu	Siemens Healthineers	2025
Jingsheng Jason Cong	University of California, Los Angeles	2017
Lynn A. Conway (died 2024)	University of Michigan	1989
Robert L. Cook	Pixar Animation Studios	2009
James W. Cooley (died 2016)	IBM Thomas J. Watson Research Center	2000
Fernando J. Corbato (died 2019)	Massachusetts Institute of Technology	1976
George R. Cotter (died 2025)	Isologic, LLC	2007
Harvey G. Cragon (died 2018)	The University of Texas at Austin	1978
John H. Crawford	Intel Corporation	2002
Marian R. Croak	Google	2022
Carolina Cruz-Neira	University of Central Florida	2018
David E Culler	University of California, Berkeley	2005
David N. Cutler	Microsoft Corporation	1994
Mary Czerwinski	Microsoft Research	2022
William J. Dally	Nvidia Corporation	2009
Ingrid Daubechies	Duke University	2015
Edward Emil David Jr. (died 2017)	Bedminster, NJ	1966
Ruth M. Davis (died 2012)	Pymatuning Group, Inc.	1976
Carl R. de Boor	University of Wisconsin-Madison	1993
Giovanni Giacomo De Micheli	EPFL	2026
Jeffrey Dean	Google	2009
Mark E. Dean	The University of Tennessee, Knoxville	2001
James W. Demmel	University of California, Berkeley	1999
Dorothy Elizabeth Denning	Naval Postgraduate School	2026
Jack B. Dennis (died 2026)	Massachusetts Institute of Technology	2009
Michael L. Dertouzos (died 2001)	Massachusetts Institute of Technology	1990
David J. DeWitt	University of Wisconsin-Madison	1998
Whitfield Diffie	Gonvill and Caius College	2017
David L. Dill	Retired	2013
Gerald Paul Dinneen (died 2012)	Honeywell Inc.	1975
Leslie C. Dirks (died 2001)	Hughes Aircraft Company	1980
Daniel W. Dobberpuhl (died 2019)	No Affiliation	2006
Jack J. Dongarra	The University of Tennessee, Knoxville	2001
Susan T Dumais	Microsoft Research	2011
Cynthia Dwork	Harvard University	2008
Susan J. Eggers	University of Washington	2006
Taher Elgamal	Salesforce	2022
Joel S. Emer	Nvidia Corporation	2020
Douglas C. Engelbart (died 2013)	Bootstrap Alliance/Doug Engelbart Institute	1996
Paul England	Datica Research	2019
Deborah S. Estrin	Cornell NYC Tech	2009
Judith L. Estrin	JLabs, LLC	2025
Bob O. Evans (died 2004)	Rocket Ventures	1970
David C. Evans (died 1998)	Evans & Sutherland Computer Corporation	1978
Robert R. Everett (died 2018)	MITRE Corporation	1979
Ronald Fagin	IBM Almaden Research Center	2014
John W. Fairclough (died 2003)	Rothschild Ventures Ltd.	1990
Robert M. Fano (died 2016)	Massachusetts Institute of Technology	1973
Edward A. Feigenbaum	Stanford University	1986
Alexander Feiner (died 2014)	AT&T Bell Laboratories	1984
Jean H. Felker (died 1994)	AT&T Bell Laboratories	1974
Edward W. Felten	Princeton University	2013
James D. Foley	Georgia Institute of Technology	2008
Howard Frank (died 2017)	University of Maryland, College Park	2002
Alexander G. Fraser (died 2022)	Fraser Research	2005
William T. Freeman	Google	2021
Ivan T. Frisch (died 2023)	New York University	2000
Henry Fuchs	University of North Carolina at Chapel Hill	1997
Samuel H. Fuller	Analog Devices, Inc.	1991
Zvi Galil	Georgia Institute of Technology	2004
Hector Garcia-Molina (died 2019)	Stanford University	2003
Bill Gates	Gates Foundation	1996
C. William Gear (died 2022)	University of Illinois Urbana-Champaign	1992
Neil Gershenfeld	Massachusetts Institute of Technology	2023
Charles M. Geschke (died 2021)	Adobe Systems Inc.	1995
Sanjay Ghemawat	Google	2009
Darío Gil	International Business Machines Corporation	2024
Fred Glover	Entanglement, Inc.	2002
Bernard Gold (died 2005)	MIT Lincoln Laboratory	1982
Shafrira Goldwasser	University of California, Berkeley	2005
Gene H. Golub (died 2007)	Stanford University	1990
Ralph E. Gomory	New York University	1975
James Goodnight	SAS Institute, Inc.	2023
James Arthur Gosling	Amazon.com	2004
Susan L. Graham	University of California, Berkeley	1993
James N. Gray (died 2012)	Microsoft Corporation	1995
Albert G. Greenberg	Uber Technologies, Inc.	2016
Donald P. Greenberg	Cornell University	1991
Diane B. Greene	The MIT Corporation	2018
Leslie F. Greengard	Flatiron Institute	2006
Irene Greif	IBM Thomas J. Watson Research Center	2010
Helen Greiner	ASA(ALT), US Army	2013
William D. Gropp	University of Illinois Urbana-Champaign	2010
Barbara J. Grosz	Harvard University	2008
Carlos Guestrin	Stanford University	2024
Leonidas J. Guibas	Stanford University	2017
Laura M. Haas	University of Massachusetts at Amherst	2010
Donald J. Haderle	IBM Silicon Valley Laboratory	2008
Robert S. Hahn (died 2021)	Hahn Engineering, Inc.	1984
Joseph Y. Halpern (died 2026)	Cornell University	2019
James Robert Hamilton	Amazon	2026
Richard W. Hamming (died 1998)	U.S. Naval Postgraduate School	1980
Patrick M. Hanrahan	Stanford University	1999
Vicki Lynne Hanson (died 2026)	Association for Computing Machinery	2020
David Harel	Weizmann Institute of Science	2014
Peter E. Hart	Ricoh Innovations Corporation	2024
Juris Hartmanis (died 2022)	Cornell University	1989
Demis Hassabis	Google DeepMind	2026
Jozsef Hatvany (died 1987)	Hungarian Academy of Sciences	1985
Jeff Hawkins	Numenta	2003
Robert A. Henle (died 1989)	International Business Machines Corporation	1982
John L. Hennessy	Stanford University	1992
Maurice Peter Herlihy	Brown University	2013
Nicholas J. Higham (died 2024)	University of Manchester	2023
William Daniel Hillis	Applied Invention, LLC	2001
Geoffrey E. Hinton	University of Toronto	2016
Julia Hirschberg	Columbia University	2017
Tony Hoare (died 2026)	Microsoft Research	2006
Urs Hölzle	Google	2013
Gerard J. Holzmann	Nimble Research	2005
John E. Hopcroft	Cornell University	1989
Berthold K.P. Horn	Massachusetts Institute of Technology	2002
Mark A. Horowitz	Stanford University	2007
Eric Horvitz	Microsoft	2013
Jen-Hsun Huang	Nvidia Corporation	2024
Xuedong D. Huang	Zoom Video Communications	2023
William H. Huggins (died 2001)	Johns Hopkins University	1970
Piotr Indyk	Massachusetts Institute of Technology	2026
Mary Jane Irwin	The Pennsylvania State University - University Park	2003
Farnam Jahanian	Carnegie Mellon University	2026
Anil K. Jain	Michigan State University	2016
Andy Jassy	Amazon	2025
Frederick Jelinek (died 2010)	Johns Hopkins University	2006
Lawrence E. Jenkins (died 1996)	Lockheed Corporation	1984
Steven P. Jobs (died 2011)	Apple Inc.	1997
David S. Johnson (died 2016)	Columbia University	2016
Reynold B. Johnson (died 1998)	IBM Almaden Research Center	1981
Anita K. Jones	University of Virginia	1994
Michael I. Jordan	University of California, Berkeley	2010
Aravind K. Joshi (died 2017)	University of Pennsylvania	1999
Norman P. Jouppi	Google	2014
William N. Joy	Retired-Other	1999
John Michael Jumper	Google DeepMind	2026
M. Frans Kaashoek	Massachusetts Institute of Technology	2006
William M. Kahan	University of California, Berkeley	2005
Brewster L. Kahle	Internet Archive	2010
Robert E. Kahn	Corporation for National Research Initiatives	1987
James T. Kajiya	Tolt Machine Works Inc.	2002
Takeo Kanade	Carnegie Mellon University	1997
Anna Karlin	University of Washington	2022
Richard M. Karp	University of California, Berkeley	1992
Dina Katabi	Massachusetts Institute of Technology	2017
Randy H. Katz	University of California, Berkeley	2000
Alan C. Kay	Viewpoints Research Institute Inc.	1997
Francis P. Kelly	University of Cambridge	2012
Ken Kennedy (died 2007)	Rice University	1990
Stephen Thomas Kent	Raytheon BBN Technologies	2026
Brian W. Kernighan	Princeton University	2002
Raymond W. Ketchledge (died 1987)	AT&T Bell Laboratories	1970
Oussama Khatib	Stanford University	2018
Pradeep K. Khosla	University of California, San Diego	2006
Sara B. Kiesler	Carnegie Mellon University	2019
Tom Kilburn (died 2000)	University of Manchester	1980
Leon K. Kirchmayer (died 1995)	General Electric	1979
David B. Kirk	Nvidia Corporation	2006
Peter T. Kirstein (died 2020)	University College London	2009
Jon M. Kleinberg	Cornell University	2008
Leonard Kleinrock	University of California, Los Angeles	1980
Donald E. Knuth	Stanford University	1981
Paul C. Kocher	Cryptography Research Inc.	2009
Tamara G. Kolda	Sandia National Laboratories	2020
Daphne Koller	Stanford University	2011
David J. Kuck	Intel Corporation	1991
Jack D. Kuehler (died 2008)	Independent Consultant	1984
H. T. Kung	Harvard University	1993
James F. Kurose	University of Massachusetts at Amherst	2020
Raymond C. Kurzweil	Google	2001
Monica S. Lam	Stanford University	2019
Simon S. Lam	The University of Texas at Austin	2007
Leslie B. Lamport	No Affiliation	1991
Butler W. Lampson	Massachusetts Institute of Technology	1984
Edward D. Lazowska	University of Washington	2001
Yann Andre LeCun	New York University	2017
F. Thomson Leighton	Akamai Technologies, Inc.	2004
Charles E. Leiserson	Massachusetts Institute of Technology	2016
Michael Lesk	Rutgers University–New Brunswick	2005
Nancy G. Leveson	Massachusetts Institute of Technology	2000
Marc Stewart Levoy	Stanford University	2022
Henry M. Levy	University of Washington	2011
Fei-Fei Li	Stanford University	2020
Kai Li	Princeton University	2012
Bruce G. Lindsay	IBM Corporation	2016
Steven B. Lipner	SAFECode	2017
Richard J. Lipton	Georgia Institute of Technology	1999
Barbara H. Liskov	Massachusetts Institute of Technology	1988
David B. Lomet	Microsoft Corporation	2018
Tomas Lozano-Perez	Massachusetts Institute of Technology	2025
Nancy A. Lynch	Massachusetts Institute of Technology	2001
Yoelle Maarek	Technology Innovation Institute	2021
Jock Douglas Mackinlay	Salesforce	2023
Jitendra Malik	University of California, Berkeley	2011
Henrique S. Malvar	Microsoft Corporation	2012
John L. Manferdelli	Datica Research	2025
Christopher David Manning	Stanford University	2025
Margaret R. Martonosi	Princeton University	2021
Maja Mataric	University of Southern California	2025
Max V. Mathews (died 2011)	Stanford University	1979
John McCarthy (died 2011)	Stanford University	1987
Brian McClendon	University of Kansas	2015
Edward J. McCluskey (died 2016)	Stanford University	1998
M. Douglas McIlroy	Dartmouth College	2006
Nicholas William McKeown	Stanford University	2011
Kenneth L. McMillan	The University of Texas at Austin	2026
Gerard Guy Medioni	Amazon	2023
Kurt Mehlhorn	Max Planck Institute for Informatics	2014
Teresa H. Meng	Stanford University	2007
David G. Messerschmitt	University of California, Berkeley	1990
Robert M. Metcalfe	The University of Texas at Austin	1997
Silvio Micali	Massachusetts Institute of Technology	2007
Stewart E. Miller (died 1990)	AT&T Bell Laboratories	1973
William F. Miller (died 2017)	Stanford University	1987
David L. Mills (died 2024)	University of Delaware	2008
Robin Milner (died 2010)	University of Cambridge	2008
Marvin L. Minsky (died 2016)	Massachusetts Institute of Technology	1989
Jayadev Misra	The University of Texas at Austin	2018
Joan L. Mitchell (died 2015)	InfoPrint Solutions Company	2004
Tom M. Mitchell	Carnegie Mellon University	2010
Arvind Mithal (died 2024)	Massachusetts Institute of Technology	2008
Paul V. Mockapetris	ThreatSTOP, Inc	2006
C. Mohan	Tsinghua University	2009
Cleve B. Moler	MathWorks	1997
J. Strother Moore	The University of Texas at Austin	2007
Robert T. Morris	Massachusetts Institute of Technology	2019
Joel Moses (died 2022)	Massachusetts Institute of Technology	1986
James H. Mulligan Jr. (died 1996)	University of California, Irvine	1974
N.R. Narayana Murthy	Catamaran Management Services Pvt. Ltd.	2010
Eugene W. Myers	Max Planck Institute for Molecular Cell Biology and Genetics	2003
Satya Nadella	Microsoft Corporation	2022
Shrikanth Sambasivan Narayanan	University of Southern California	2026
P. Pandurang Nayak	Google	2024
Shree K. Nayar	Columbia University	2008
Philip M. Neches (died 2022)	Entrepreneurs Roundtable Accelerator	2012
Arun N. Netravali (died 2021)	OmniCapital, LLC	1989
Martin E. Newell	Adobe Systems Inc.	2007
A. Richard Newton (died 2007)	University of California, Berkeley	2004
Nils John Nilsson (died 2019)	Stanford University	2018
Donald A. Norman	University of California, San Diego	2011
William C. Norris (died 2006)	William C. Norris Institute	1988
Bernard M. Oliver (died 1995)	Hewlett-Packard Company	1966
Kenneth H. Olsen (died 2011)	Modular Services, LLC	1977
Judith S. Olson	University of California, Irvine	2018
Oyekunle Olukotun	Stanford University	2021
Stanley Joel Osher	University of California, Los Angeles	2018
Mari Ostendorf	University of Washington	2021
John K. Ousterhout	Stanford University	2001
Raymond E. Ozzie	Retired-Other	2004
Lawrence Edward Page	Google	2004
Ralph L. Palmer (died 2005)	International Business Machines Corporation	1983
Sethuraman Panchanathan	National Science Foundation	2024
Christos Papadimitriou	Columbia University	2002
Yale N. Patt	The University of Texas at Austin	2014
David A. Patterson	University of California, Berkeley	1993
Judea Pearl	University of California, Los Angeles	1995
Alex Pentland	Massachusetts Institute of Technology	2014
Fernando C. Pereira	Google	2021
Radia Joy Perlman	EMC Corporation	2015
Larry L. Peterson	Princeton University	2010
Linda R. Petzold	University of California, Santa Barbara	2004
Rosalind Picard	Massachusetts Institute of Technology	2019
E. R. Piore (died 2000)	International Business Machines Corporation	1966
Amir Pnueli (died 2009)	New York University	1999
John William Poduska Sr.	Novell, Inc.	1986
James H. Pomerene (died 2008)	IBM Thomas J. Watson Research Center	1988
Lawrence R. Rabiner	Rutgers University–New Brunswick	1983
Prabhakar Raghavan	Google	2008
Marc Raibert	Boston Dynamics	2008
Jan A. Rajchman (died 1989)	RCA Corporation	1966
Richard F. Rashid	Microsoft Corporation	2003
Raj Reddy	Carnegie Mellon University	1984
Irving S. Reed (died 2012)	University of Southern California	1979
Aristides A. G. Requicha (died 2023)	University of Southern California	2011
Jennifer Rexford	Princeton University	2014
John R. Rice (died 2024)	Purdue University	1994
Dennis M. Ritchie (died 2011)	Bell Laboratories, Lucent Technologies	1988
Ronald L. Rivest	Massachusetts Institute of Technology	1990
Yvonne Rogers	University College London	2024
Vladimir Rokhlin	Yale University	2008
Jonathan Scott Rose	University of Toronto	2011
Mendel Rosenblum	Stanford University	2009
Jonathan J. Rubinstein	No Affiliation	2005
Daniela Rus	Massachusetts Institute of Technology	2015
Stuart J. Russell	University of California, Berkeley	2025
Jerome H. Saltzer	Massachusetts Institute of Technology	1998
Jean E. Sammet (died 2017)	Independent Consultant	1977
Alberto L. Sangiovanni-Vincentelli	University of California, Berkeley	1998
Guillermo R. Sapiro	Princeton University	2022
S. Shankar Sastry	University of California, Berkeley	2001
Mahadev Satyanarayanan	Carnegie Mellon University	2025
Stefan Savage	University of California, San Diego	2023
Robert E. Schapire	Microsoft Research	2014
Eric E. Schmidt	Google	2006
Fred B. Schneider	Cornell University	2011
Jacob T. Schwartz (died 2009)	New York University	2000
Charles L. Seitz	No Affiliation	1992
Patricia G. Selinger	International Business Machines Corporation	1999
Abigail J. Sellen	Microsoft Research	2020
Margo Ilene Seltzer	University of British Columbia	2019
James A. Sethian	University of California, Berkeley	2008
Debendra Das Sharma	Intel Corporation	2026
Amnon Shashua	Mobileye	2026
David E. Shaw	D. E. Shaw Research	2012
Noam Shazeer	Google	2026
Scott J. Shenker	University of California, Berkeley	2012
Ben A. Shneiderman	University of Maryland, College Park	2010
Peter W. Shor	Massachusetts Institute of Technology	2020
Harry Shum	Microsoft Corporation	2017
Daniel P. Siewiorek	Carnegie Mellon University	2000
Joseph Sifakis	Université Grenoble-Alpes	2017
Charles Simonyi	Microsoft Corporation	1997
W. David Sincoskie (died 2010)	University of Delaware	2000
Pradeep S. Sindhu	Microsoft	2013
Amit Singhal	Sitare Foundatioin	2012
Richard L. Sites	Google	2008
Larry L. Smarr	University of California, San Diego	1995
Alvy Ray Smith	ars longa	2006
Burton J. Smith (died 2018)	Microsoft Corporation	2003
Gurindar S. Sohi	University of Wisconsin-Madison	2009
Alfred Z. Spector	Massachusetts Institute of Technology	2004
Robert J. Spinrad (died 2009)	Xerox Corporation	1993
Robert F. Sproull	University of Massachusetts at Amherst	1997
Richard M. Stallman	Free Software Foundation, Inc.	2002
Gary K. Starkweather (died 2019)	Microsoft Corporation	2004
Guy Lewis Steele Jr.	Oracle Labs	2001
Matthias Steffen	International Business Machines Corporation	2024
G.W. (Pete) Stewart	University of Maryland, College Park	2004
George R. Stibitz (died 1995)	Dartmouth College	1981
Thomas G. Stockham Jr. (died 2004)	University of Utah	1998
Ion Stoica	University of California, Berkeley	2024
Michael R. Stonebraker	Massachusetts Institute of Technology	1997
William D. Strecker	In-Q-Tel, Inc.	1987
Bjarne Stroustrup	Columbia University	2004
Edward H. Sussenguth (died 2015)	International Business Machines Corporation	1992
Gerald J. Sussman	Massachusetts Institute of Technology	2000
Ivan E. Sutherland	Portland State University	1973
John A. Swanson	Swanson Analysis Services, Inc.	2009
Richard Szeliski	Google	2015
Richard A. Tapia	Rice University	1992
Éva Tardos	Cornell University	2007
Robert E. Tarjan	Princeton University	1988
Robert W. Taylor (died 2017)	Digital Equipment Corporation	1991
Russell H. Taylor	Johns Hopkins University	2020
Charles P. Thacker (died 2017)	Microsoft Corporation	1994
Kenneth Thompson	Google	1980
J. George Thon (died 1988)	Independent Consultant	1975
Sebastian Thrun	Stanford University	2007
Joseph Frederick Traub (died 2015)	Columbia University	1985
Lloyd N. Trefethen	Harvard University	2007
Stephen M. Trimberger	The Trimberger Family Foundation	2016
Jonathan S. Turner	Washington University in St. Louis	2007
Jeffrey D. Ullman	Stanford University	1989
Keith W. Uncapher (died 2002)	Corporation for National Research Initiatives	1998
Amin Vahdat	Google	2023
Andries van Dam	Brown University	1996
Van Jacobson	Google	2004
Vladimir N. Vapnik	Columbia University	2006
Moshe Y. Vardi	Rice University	2002
George Varghese	University of California, Los Angeles	2017
Manuela Veloso	JPMorgan Chase	2022
Steven J. Wallach	Los Alamos National Laboratory	1995
Willis H. Ware (died 2013)	The RAND Corporation	1985
John E. Warnock (died 2023)	Adobe Systems Inc.	1996
Tadashi Watanabe	RIKEN	2008
Michael S. Waterman	University of Southern California	2012
Frederick D. Weber	Independent Consultant	2005
Mark N. Wegman	IBM Thomas J. Watson Research Center	2010
Elaine Weyuker	University of Central Florida	2002
Telle Whitney	Telle Whitney Consulting, LLC	2022
William L. Whittaker	Carnegie Mellon University	2009
J. Turner Whitted	TW Interactive Research	2003
Jennifer Widom	Stanford University	2005
Maurice V. Wilkes (died 2010)	University of Cambridge	1977
Jeannette M. Wing	Columbia University	2024
Terry Allen Winograd	Stanford University	2026
Niklaus Wirth (died 2024)	ETH Zurich	1993
Steve Wozniak	New Leaf Speakers, LLC	2002
Margaret H. Wright	New York University	1997
Wm. A. Wulf (died 2023)	University of Virginia	1993
Mihalis Yannakakis	Columbia University	2011
Katherine Anne Yelick	University of California, Berkeley	2017
Eric S. Yuan	Zoom Communications	2025
Moti Yung	Google	2026
Lotfi A. Zadeh (died 2017)	University of California, Berkeley	1973
HongJiang Zhang	Beijing Academy of Artificial Intelligence	2022
Lixia Zhang	University of California, Los Angeles	2025
Victor W. Zue	Massachusetts Institute of Technology	2004
Konrad Zuse (died 1995)	University of Gottingen	1981
