= Computer graphics (computer science) =

Sub-field of computer science

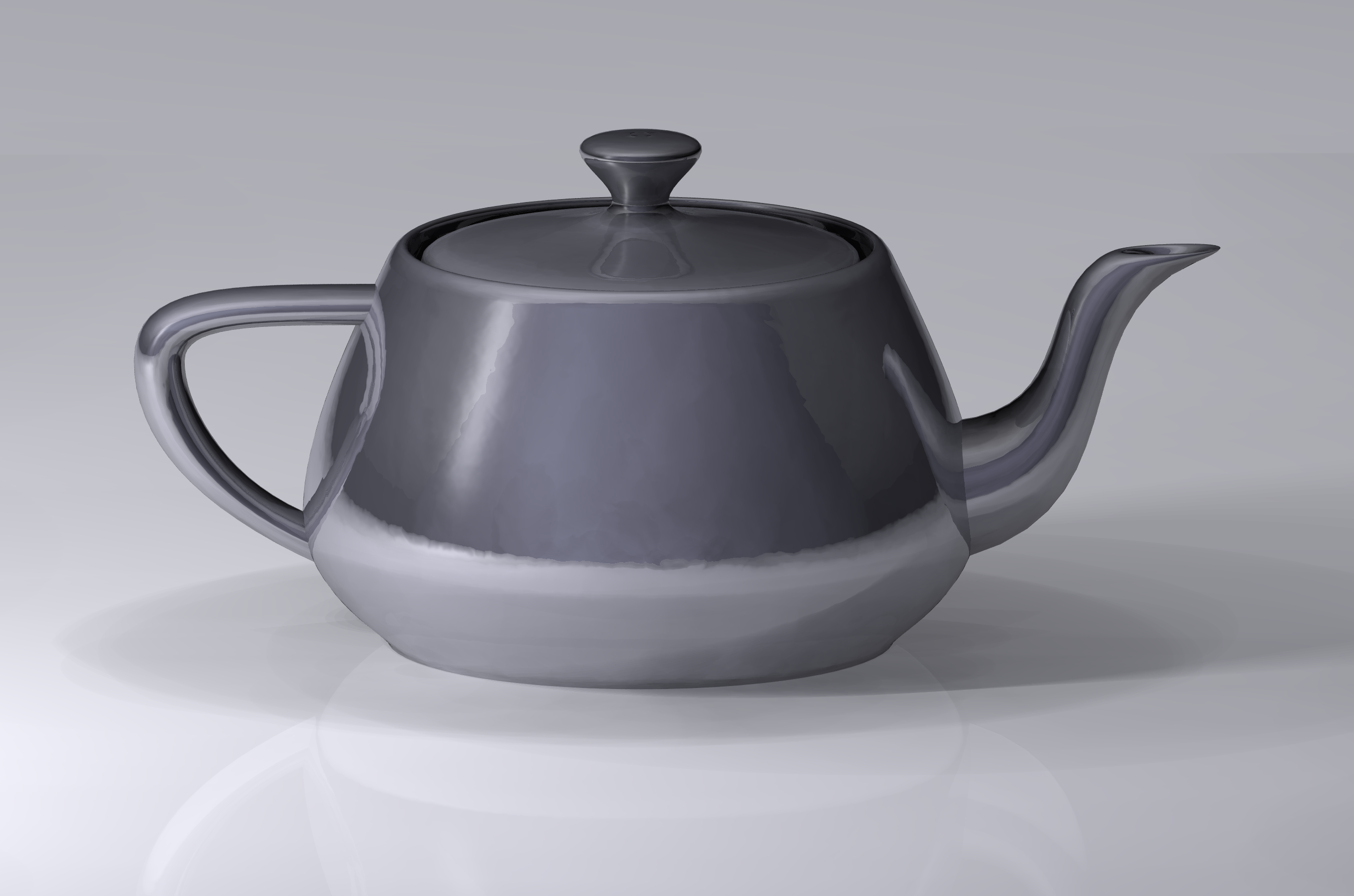
A modern rendering of the Utah teapot, an iconic model in 3D computer graphics created by Martin Newell in 1975

Computer graphics is a sub-field of computer science which studies methods for digitally synthesizing and manipulating visual content. Although the term often refers to the study of three-dimensional computer graphics, it also encompasses two-dimensional computer graphics and image processing.

== Overview ==
Computer graphics studies manipulation of visual and geometric information using computational techniques. It focuses on the mathematical and computational foundations of image generation and processing rather than purely aesthetic issues. Computer graphics is often differentiated from the field of visualization, although the two fields have many similarities.

Connected studies include:

- Applied mathematics
- Computational geometry
- Computational topology
- Computer vision
- Image processing
- Information visualization
- Scientific visualization

Applications of computer graphics include:

- Print design
- Digital art
- Special effects
- Video games
- Visual effects

== History ==
Computer graphics emerged from broader advances in computing, display technology, and human-computer interaction. Early systems commonly used vector displays, and a major milestone came in 1963 with Ivan Sutherland's Sketchpad, an interactive program on the TX-2 that allowed users to create and manipulate line drawings in real time with a light pen. Sketchpad is widely regarded as foundational to interactive computer graphics and computer-aided design.

During the late 1960s and 1970s, research groups such as the University of Utah graphics lab established many of the core ideas of modern 3D graphics. Work there and elsewhere helped move the field from wire-frame line drawings toward polygonal models, shaded surfaces, and computer animation. In 1975, Martin Newell created the Utah teapot, which became a standard test model for rendering techniques and visual realism.

In the late 1970s and 1980s, raster graphics became more common for producing more realistic images, and by the 1990s dedicated graphics processing units made real-time 3D graphics increasingly practical on personal computers, workstations, and game systems. As the field grew, it also developed dedicated research venues, including SIGGRAPH, which was formally organized in 1969, Eurographics, founded in 1980, and the journal ACM Transactions on Graphics.

== Subfields ==
A broad classification of major subfields in computer graphics might be:

1. Geometry: ways to represent and process surfaces
2. Animation: ways to represent and manipulate motion
3. Rendering: algorithms to reproduce light transport
4. Imaging: image acquisition or image editing

=== Geometry ===
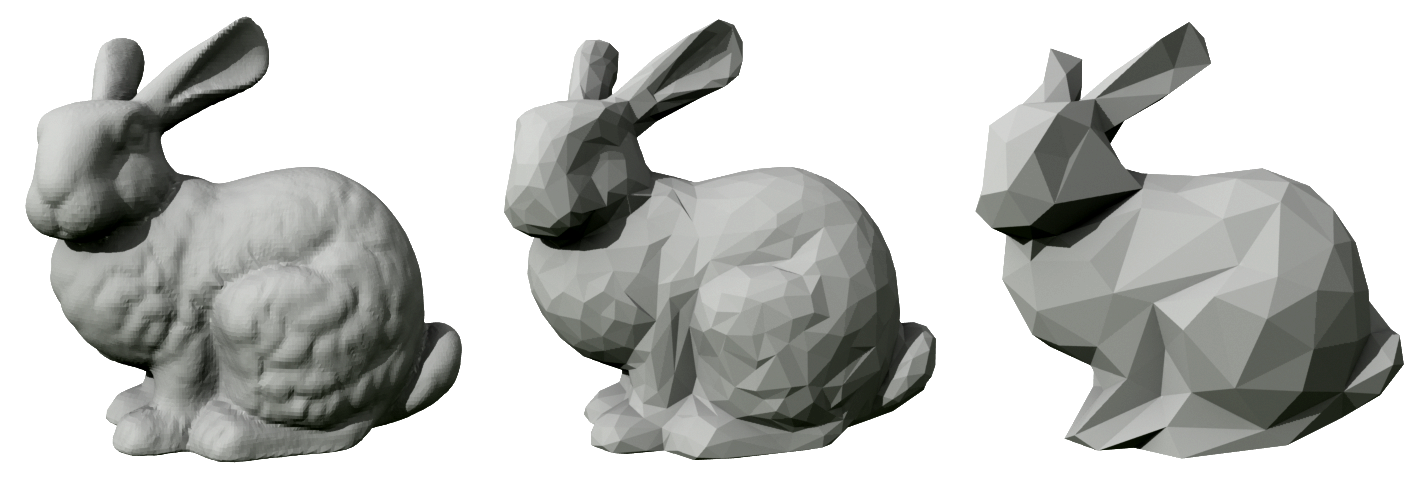
Successive approximations of a surface computed using quadric error metrics

The subfield of geometry studies the representation of three-dimensional objects in a discrete digital setting. Because the appearance of an object depends largely on its exterior, boundary representations are most commonly used. Two dimensional surfaces are a good representation for most objects, though they may be non-manifold. Since surfaces are not finite, discrete digital approximations are used. Polygonal meshes (and to a lesser extent subdivision surfaces) are by far the most common representation, although point-based representations have become more popular recently (see for instance the Symposium on Point-Based Graphics). These representations are Lagrangian, meaning the spatial locations of the samples are independent. Recently, Eulerian surface descriptions (i.e., where spatial samples are fixed) such as level sets have been developed into a useful representation for deforming surfaces which undergo many topological changes (with fluids being the most notable example).

Geometry subfields include:

- Implicit surface modeling – an older subfield which examines the use of algebraic surfaces, constructive solid geometry, etc., for surface representation.
- Digital geometry processing – surface reconstruction, simplification, fairing, mesh repair, parameterization, remeshing, mesh generation, surface compression, and surface editing all fall under this heading.
- Discrete differential geometry – a nascent field which defines geometric quantities for the discrete surfaces used in computer graphics.
- Point-based graphics – a recent field which focuses on points as the fundamental representation of surfaces.
- Subdivision surfaces
- Out-of-core mesh processing – another recent field which focuses on mesh datasets that do not fit in main memory.

=== Animation ===
The subfield of animation studies descriptions for surfaces (and other phenomena) that move or deform over time. Historically, most work in this field has focused on parametric and data-driven models, but recently physical simulation has become more popular as computers have become more powerful computationally.

Animation subfields include:

- Performance capture
- Character animation
- Physical simulation (e.g. cloth modeling, animation of fluid dynamics, etc.)

=== Rendering ===
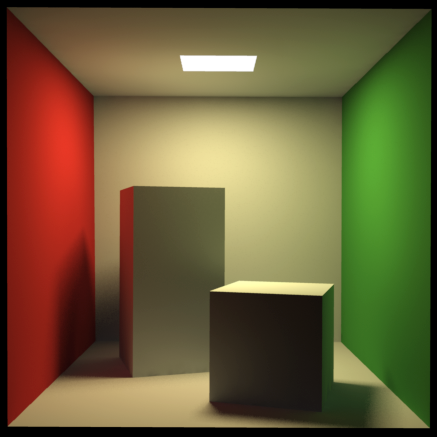
Indirect diffuse scattering simulated using path tracing and irradiance caching

Rendering generates images from a model. Rendering may simulate light transport to create realistic images or it may create images that have a particular artistic style in non-photorealistic rendering. The two basic operations in realistic rendering are transport (how much light passes from one place to another) and scattering (how surfaces interact with light).

Rendering subfields include:

- Transport describes how illumination in a scene gets from one place to another. Visibility is a major component of light transport.
- Scattering: Models of scattering (how light interacts with the surface at a given point) and shading (how material properties vary across the surface) are used to describe the appearance of a surface. In graphics these problems are often studied within the context of rendering since they can substantially affect the design of rendering algorithms. Descriptions of scattering are usually given in terms of a bidirectional scattering distribution function (BSDF). The latter issue addresses how different types of scattering are distributed across the surface (i.e., which scattering function applies where). Descriptions of this kind are typically expressed with a program called a shader. (There is some confusion since the word "shader" is sometimes used for programs that describe local geometric variation.)
- Non-photorealistic rendering
- Physically based rendering – concerned with generating images according to the laws of geometric optics
- Real-time rendering – focuses on rendering for interactive applications, typically using specialized hardware like GPUs
- Relighting – recent area concerned with quickly re-rendering scenes

== Notable researchers ==
- Arthur Appel
- James Arvo
- Brian A. Barsky
- Jim Blinn
- Jack E. Bresenham
- Loren Carpenter
- Edwin Catmull
- James H. Clark
- Robert L. Cook
- Franklin C. Crow
- Paul Debevec
- David C. Evans
- Ron Fedkiw
- Steven K. Feiner
- James D. Foley
- David Forsyth
- Henry Fuchs
- Andrew Glassner
- Henri Gouraud (computer scientist)
- Donald P. Greenberg
- Eric Haines
- R. A. Hall
- Pat Hanrahan
- John Hughes
- Jim Kajiya
- Takeo Kanade
- Kenneth Knowlton
- Marc Levoy
- Martin Newell (computer scientist)
- James O'Brien
- Ken Perlin
- Matt Pharr
- Bui Tuong Phong
- Przemyslaw Prusinkiewicz
- William Reeves
- David F. Rogers
- Holly Rushmeier
- Peter Shirley
- James Sethian
- Ivan Sutherland
- Demetri Terzopoulos
- Kenneth Torrance
- Greg Turk
- Andries van Dam
- Henrik Wann Jensen
- Gregory Ward
- John Warnock
- J. Turner Whitted
- Lance Williams

== Applications for their use ==
Bitmap Design / Image Editing

- Adobe Photoshop
- Corel Photo-Paint
- GIMP
- Krita

Vector drawing

- Adobe Illustrator
- CorelDRAW
- Inkscape
- Affinity Designer
- Sketch

Architecture

- VariCAD
- FreeCAD
- AutoCAD
- QCAD
- LibreCAD
- DataCAD
- Corel Designer

Video editing

- Adobe Premiere Pro
- Sony Vegas
- Final Cut
- DaVinci Resolve
- Cinelerra
- VirtualDub

Sculpting, Animation, and 3D Modeling

- Blender 3D
- Wings 3D
- ZBrush
- Sculptris
- SolidWorks
- Rhino3D
- SketchUp
- 3ds Max
- Cinema 4D
- Maya
- Houdini

Digital composition

- Nuke
- Blackmagic Fusion
- Adobe After Effects
- Natron

Rendering

- V-Ray
- RedShift
- RenderMan
- Octane Render
- Mantra
- Lumion (Architectural visualization)

Other applications examples

- ACIS - geometric core
- Autodesk Softimage
- POV-Ray
- Scribus
- Silo
- Hexagon
- Lightwave

== See also ==
- Computer facial animation
- Computer science
- Computer science and engineering
- Computer graphics
- Digital geometry
- Digital image editing
- Geometry processing
- Painter's algorithm
- Stanford Bunny
- Utah Teapot
