= ACM SIGGRAPH =

ACM's Special Interest Group on Computer Graphics

ACM SIGGRAPH logo

ACM SIGGRAPH is the international Association for Computing Machinery's Special Interest Group on Computer Graphics and Interactive Techniques based in New York. It was founded in 1969 by Andy van Dam (its direct predecessor, ACM SICGRAPH was founded two years earlier in 1967).

ACM SIGGRAPH convenes the annual SIGGRAPH conference, attended by tens of thousands of computer professionals. The organization also sponsors other conferences around the world, and regular events are held by its professional and student chapters in several countries.

== Committees ==
=== Professional and Student Chapters Committee ===
The Professional and Student Chapters Committee (PSCC) is the leadership group that oversees the activities of ACM SIGGRAPH Chapters around the world. Details about Local Chapters can be found below.

=== International Resources Committee ===
The International Resources Committee (IRC) facilitates throughout the year worldwide collaboration in the ACM SIGGRAPH community, provides an English review service to help submitters whose first language is not English, and encourages participation in all SIGGRAPH conference venues, activities, and events.

== Awards ==
ACM SIGGRAPH presents six awards to recognize achievement in computer graphics. The awards are presented at the annual SIGGRAPH conference.

=== Steven A. Coons Award ===
The Steven Anson Coons Award for Outstanding Creative Contributions to Computer Graphics is considered the highest award in computer graphics, and is presented each odd-numbered year to individuals who have made a lifetime contribution to computer graphics. It is named for Steven Anson Coons, an early pioneer in interactive computer graphics.

Recipients:

- Leonidas J. Guibas (2025)
- Marie-Paule Cani (2023)
- Markus Gross (2021)
- Michael F. Cohen (2019)
- Jessica Hodgins (2017)
- Henry Fuchs (2015)
- Turner Whitted (2013)
- Jim Kajiya (2011)
- Robert L. Cook (2009)
- Nelson Max (2007)
- Tomoyuki Nishita (2005)
- Pat Hanrahan (2003)
- Lance J. Williams (2001)
- James F. Blinn (1999)
- James D. Foley (1997)
- José Luis Encarnação (1995)
- Edwin Catmull (1993)
- Andries van Dam (1991)
- David C. Evans (1989)
- Donald P. Greenberg (1987)
- Pierre Bézier (1985)
- Ivan E. Sutherland (1983)

=== Computer Graphics Achievement Award ===
The Computer Graphics Achievement award is given each year to recognize individuals for an outstanding achievement in computer graphics and interactive techniques that provided a significant advance in the state of the art of computer graphics and is still significant and apparent.

Recipients:

- Alexei Efros (2026)
- George Drettakis (2025)
- Aaron Hertzmann (2024)
- Wolfgang Heidrich (2023)
- Michiel van de Panne (2022)
- Doug L. James (2021)
- Kavita Bala (2020)
- Denis Zorin (2019)
- Daniel Cohen-Or (2018)
- Ramesh Raskar (2017)
- Frédo Durand (2016)
- Steve Marschner (2015)
- Thomas Funkhouser (2014)
- Holly Rushmeier (2013)
- Greg Turk (2012)
- Richard Szeliski (2011)
- Jessica Hodgins (2010)
- Michael Kass (2009)
- Ken Perlin (2008)
- Greg Ward (2007)
- Thomas W. Sederberg (2006)
- Jos Stam (2005)
- Hugues Hoppe (2004)
- Peter Schröder (2003)
- David Kirk (2002)
- Andrew Witkin (2001)
- David H. Salesin (2000)
- Tony DeRose (1999)
- Michael F. Cohen (1998)
- Przemyslaw Prusinkiewicz (1997)
- Marc Levoy (1996)
- Kurt Akeley (1995)
- Kenneth E. Torrance (1994)
- Pat Hanrahan (1993)
- Henry Fuchs (1992)
- James T. Kajiya (1991)
- Richard Shoup and Alvy Ray Smith (1990)
- John Warnock (1989)
- Alan H. Barr (1988)
- Robert Cook (1987)
- Turner Whitted (1986)
- Loren Carpenter (1985)
- James H. Clark (1984)
- James F. Blinn (1983)

=== Significant New Researcher Award ===
The Significant New Researcher Award is given annually to a researcher with a recent significant contribution to computer graphics.

Recipients:

- Lingjie Liu (2026)
- Ben Mildenhall and Pratul Srinivasan (2025)
- Adriana Schulz (2024)
- Felix Heide (2023)
- Justin Solomon (2022)
- Jonathan Ragan-Kelley (2021)
- Alec Jacobson (2020)
- Wenzel Jakob (2019)
- Gordon Wetzstein (2018)
- Bernd Bickel (2017)
- Chris Wojtan (2016)
- Johannes Kopf (2015)
- Noah Snavely (2014)
- Niloy Mitra (2013)
- Karen Liu (2012)
- Olga Sorkine-Hornung (2011)
- Alexei Efros (2010)
- Wojciech Matusik (2009)
- Maneesh Agrawala (2008)
- Ravi Ramamoorthi (2007)
- Takeo Igarashi (2006)
- Ron Fedkiw (2005)
- Zoran Popović (2004)
- Mathieu Desbrun (2003)
- Steven J. Gortler (2002)
- Paul E. Debevec (2001)

=== Distinguished Artist Award ===
The Distinguished Artist Award is presented annually to an artist who has created a significant body of digital art work that has advanced the aesthetic content of the medium.

Recipients:

- Claudia Hart (2026)
- Frieder Nake (2025)
- Tamiko Thiel (2024)
- Paul Brown (2023)
- Vera Molnár (2022)
- William Seaman (2021)
- Jeffrey Shaw (2020)
- Donna J. Cox (2019)
- Monika Fleischmann (2018)
- Ernest A. Edmonds (2017)
- Steina Vasulka (2016)
- Lillian Schwartz (2015)
- Harold Cohen (2014)
- Manfred Mohr (2013)
- Jean-Pierre Hébert (2012)
- Charles Csuri (2011)
- Yoichiro Kawaguchi (2010)
- Lynn Hershman Leeson and Roman Verostko (2009)

== Professional and Student Chapters ==
Within their local areas, Chapters continue the work of ACM SIGGRAPH on a year-round basis via their meetings and other activities. Each ACM SIGGRAPH Professional and Student Chapter consists of individuals involved in education, research & development, the arts, industry and entertainment. ACM SIGGRAPH Chapter members are interested in the advancement of computer graphics and interactive techniques, its related technologies and applications. For the annual conference, some of the Chapters produce a "Fast Forward" overview of activities.

Listed below are some examples of Chapter activities:

- MetroCAF is the annual NYC Metropolitan Area College Computer Animation Festival, organized by the New York City chapter of ACM SIGGRAPH.
- Bogota ACM SIGGRAPH has become one of the largest Animation and VFX events in Latin America, counting more than 6,000 registered attendees in 2015’s edition.
- ACM SIGGRAPH Helsinki runs an evening-long graphics conference called SyysGraph, which is held autumn every year. The seminar strives to bring the latest updates of the 3D graphics field, demos, animations and interactive technologies. The presentations are held in English.
- Silicon Valley ACM SIGGRAPH held "Star Wars: The Force Awakens" Visual Effects Panel with Industrial Light & Magic.

== See also ==
- Association for Computing Machinery
- ACM Transactions on Graphics
- Computer Graphics, its defunct quarterly periodical publication.
- SIGGRAPH Conferences
