= Tom Porter (computer scientist) =

Thomas K. Porter is the senior vice president of production strategy at Pixar and one of the studio's founding employees.

== Professional life ==
After receiving a master's degree in computer science at Stanford University in 1975, Porter worked at the National Institutes of Health on computer visualization of molecular models and wrote software at Ampex for the world's first commercial digital paint program, AVA.

Porter joined Lucasfilm's Computer Research and Development Division in early 1981. He and Tom Duff, another Lucasfilm employee, developed a new approach to compositing images; their 1984 paper, "Compositing Digital Images", is "[t]he seminal work on an algebra for image compositing", according to Keith Packard. "Porter-Duff compositing" is now a key technique in computer graphics.

Porter is listed as one of Pixar's 40 founding employees at the time of its spin-out as a corporation with funding from Steve Jobs in 1986.

Porter expanded on Robert L. Cook’s research into Monte Carlo techniques for image rendering, sampling visible objects not just (spatially) within each pixel but also (temporally) throughout the interval of time that the virtual shutter is open, creating a general solution for motion blur in computer-generated imagery. Porter created the image ‘1984’ as visual proof (and timestamp) of the breakthrough.

Porter's son, Spencer, was the inspiration for Luxo Jr., Pixar's mascot and the protagonist of the short film of the same name. Porter brought his infant son Spencer to work one day and John Lasseter, playing with the child, became fascinated with his proportions. It struck Lasseter as humorous that a baby's head is huge compared with the rest of its body, and he began to model a young lamp with that in mind.

Porter has received three Academy Scientific and Technical Awards from the Academy of Motion Picture Arts and Sciences for his work with motion blur, digital compositing, and digital painting.

Porter worked on several Pixar films, notably as Supervising Technical Director of Monsters, Inc. and as associate producer of Cars and WALL-E, before assuming the role of SVP of film production at the studio.

Porter has an Erdős number of 3 in two distinct paths. One path is through Tom Duff, Porter's coauthor of "Composting Digital Images" in Computer Graphics. Duff was a coauthor of "Minimal-Energy Clusters of Hard Spheres" in Discrete & Computational Geometry with John Horton Conway and Conway coauthored "On the Distribution of Values of Angles Determined by Coplanar Points" with Paul Erdős (and H.T Croft and M.J.T Guy) in Journal of London Mathematical Society. The other path is through István Simon, Porter's coauthor on "Random Insertion into a Priority Queue Structure" in IEEE Transactions on Software Engineering. Simon was a coauthor of "Repeated Random Insertion into a Priority Queue" in Journal of Algorithms with Béla Bollobás. Bollabás authored 18 papers with Paul Erdős, including "On the structure of edge graphs" and "On a Ramsey-Turán type problem" in Bulletin of the London Mathematical Society and Journal of Combinatorial Theory, respectively.

== Appearances ==
- Porter appears in the 2007 documentary film, The Pixar Story (directed by Leslie Iwerks and also featuring Tom Hanks).

== See also ==
- List of Pixar staff
- List of people by Erdős number
- Erdős–Bacon number

== Bibliography ==
- Porter, Thomas K; Simon, István (1975). "Random Insertion into a Priority Queue Structure". IEEE Transactions on Software Engineering. 1 (3): 292–298. doi:10.1109/TSE.1975.6312854. S2CID 18907513.
- Cook, Robert L.; Porter, Thomas K; Carpenter, Loren (1984). "Distributed ray tracing". Computer Graphics. 18 (3). ACM SIGGRAPH: 137–145. doi:10.1145/964965.808590.
- Porter, Thomas; Duff, Tom (1984). "Compositing digital images". Proceedings of the 11th annual conference on Computer graphics and interactive techniques. Vol. 18. ACM SIGGRAPH. pp. 253–259. doi:10.1145/800031.808606. ISBN 0-89791-138-5. S2CID 18663039.
- Porter, Tom; Susman, Galyn (January 1, 2000). "Creating Lifelike Characters in Pixar Movies". Communications of the ACM. Association for Computing Machinery. doi:10.1145/323830.323839. S2CID 43791147.
