= Steven Anson Coons =

- Known for: Conic curve analyses Bézier surface patches (Coons patch); The Little Red Book (1967) computer graphics
- Scientific career
- Fields: Computer science
- Institutions: Chance Vought Aircraft Company; Massachusetts Institute of Technology; Syracuse University
- Notable students: Ivan Sutherland; Lawrence Roberts; Nicholas Negroponte

Steven Anson Coons (March 7, 1912 – August 1979) was an early pioneer in the field of computer graphics methods. He was a professor at the Massachusetts Institute of Technology (MIT) in the mechanical engineering department. After leaving MIT, he was a professor at Syracuse University. Coons had a vision of interactive graphics as a design tool to aid the engineer.

== Work ==
While a student at MIT, Coons was employed by the Chance Vought Aircraft Company, in the Master Dimensions Department. He developed a new conic curve based on the unit square. He published a report entitled An Analytic Method for Calculations of the Contours of Double Curved Surfaces. The surface was controlled by one through seventh order polynomials and each curve was expressed as being one unit long and the element plane in a unit square. The polynomials are written:

$$z=f(d) \text{ where }d = \frac{x-\text{origin}}{\text{range}}$$

and

$$z = a_0 + ad + a_2d^2 + \cdots + a_7 d^7$$

This concept allows for the approximate matching of any curve, conic or not. The surface element plane normally a conic curve was expressed as:

$$c = f(\Phi,u,w,\theta) \text{ all mapped into the unit square.} \,$$

By selecting proper values for Φ (similar to K in the conic family) in this equation:

$$\Phi u(w-1) + (w-u)^2 = 0 \,$$

the curve will be fixed. By arbitrarily choosing values of Φ, u and w could be solved for:

$$u = \frac{1}{\sqrt{ \Phi + \sqrt{\theta+(\theta + 1)}}} ,\, w = 1 - \theta(u)$$

During World War II, he worked on the design of aircraft surfaces, developing the mathematics to describe generalized surface patches. At MIT's Electronic Systems Laboratory he investigated the mathematical formulation for these patches, and published one of the most significant contributions to the area of geometric design, a treatise which has become known as The Little Red Book in 1967. His Coons patch was a formulation that presented the notation, mathematical foundation, and intuitive interpretation of an idea that would ultimately become the foundation for surface descriptions that are commonly used today, such as B-spline surfaces, non-uniform rational B-spline (NURB) surfaces, etc. His technique for describing a surface was to construct it out of collections of adjacent patches, which had continuity constraints that would allow surfaces to have curvature which was expected by the designer. Each patch was defined by four boundary curves, and a set of "blending functions" that defined how the interior was constructed out of interpolated values of the boundaries.

In 1961, with John Thomas Rule, Coons co-authored a book on mechanical drawing and graphic methods entitled Graphics.

Coons' students included Ivan Sutherland and Lawrence Roberts, both of whom went on to make many contributions to computer graphics and (by Roberts) to computer networks. In a 1964 MIT video, Coons and Roberts explain and demonstrate Sutherland's pioneering computer graphics program Sketchpad, then hosted on the MIT Lincoln Laboratory TX-2 computer. Coons also advised Nicholas Negroponte.

== Steven A. Coons Award ==
The Association for Computing Machinery SIGGRAPH has an award named for Coons. The Steven Anson Coons Award for Outstanding Creative Contributions to Computer Graphics is given in odd-numbered years to an individual to honor that person's lifetime contribution to computer graphics and interactive techniques. It is considered the field's most prestigious award.

=== Recipients ===
- Markus Gross (2021)
- Michael F. Cohen (2019)
- Jessica Hodgins (2017)
- Henry Fuchs (2015)
- Turner Whitted (2013)
- Jim Kajiya (2011)
- Robert L. Cook (2009)
- Nelson Max (2007)
- Tomoyuki Nishita (2005)
- Pat Hanrahan (2003)
- Lance J. Williams (2001)
- James F. Blinn (1999)
- James D. Foley (1997)
- José Luis Encarnação (1995)
- Edwin Catmull (1993)
- Andries van Dam (1991)
- David C. Evans (1989)
- Donald P. Greenberg (1987)
- Pierre Bézier (1985)
- Ivan E. Sutherland (1983)

== Research papers ==
- T.B. Sheridan, Steven A. Coons and H.M.Paynter, Some Novel Display Techniques for Driving Simulation, IEEE Transactions on Human Factors in Engineering vol. HFE5 (1) 29, 1964.
- Steven A. Coons, Computer Graphics and Innovative Engineering Design – Super-Sculptor, Datamation 12 (5) 32–34, 1966.
- Steven A. Coons, Uses of Computers in Technology, Scientific American 215 (3) 177, 1966.
- D.V. Ahuja and Steven A. Coons, Geometry for Construction and Display, IBM Systems Journal 7 (3–4) 188, 1968.
- Steven A. Coons, Modification of Shape of Piecewise Curves, Computer-Aided Design 9 (3) 178–180, 1977.
- Steven A. Coons, Constrained Least-Squares, Computers & Graphics 3 (1) 43–47, 1978.
