= Computer graphics (disambiguation) =

Computer graphics are graphics created by computers and, more generally, the representation and manipulation of pictorial data by a computer.

Computer graphics may also refer to:

- 2D computer graphics, the application of computer graphics to generating 2D imagery
- 3D computer graphics, the application of computer graphics to generating 3D imagery
- Computer animation, the art of creating moving images via the use of computers
- Computer-generated imagery, the application of the field of computer graphics to special effects in films, television programs, commercials, simulators and simulation generally, and printed media
- Computer graphics (computer science), a subfield of computer science studying mathematical and computational representations of visual objects
- Computer Graphics (publication), the journal by ACM SIGGRAPH
- Computer Graphics: Principles and Practice, the classic textbook by James D. Foley, Andries van Dam, Steven K. Feiner and John Hughes
- Computer Graphic (advertisement), a controversial television advertisement for Pot Noodle

== See also ==
- Display device, the hardware used to present computer graphics
- Graphics hardware, the computer hardware used to accelerate the creation of images
