= Kavita Bala =

Indian computer scientist and academic

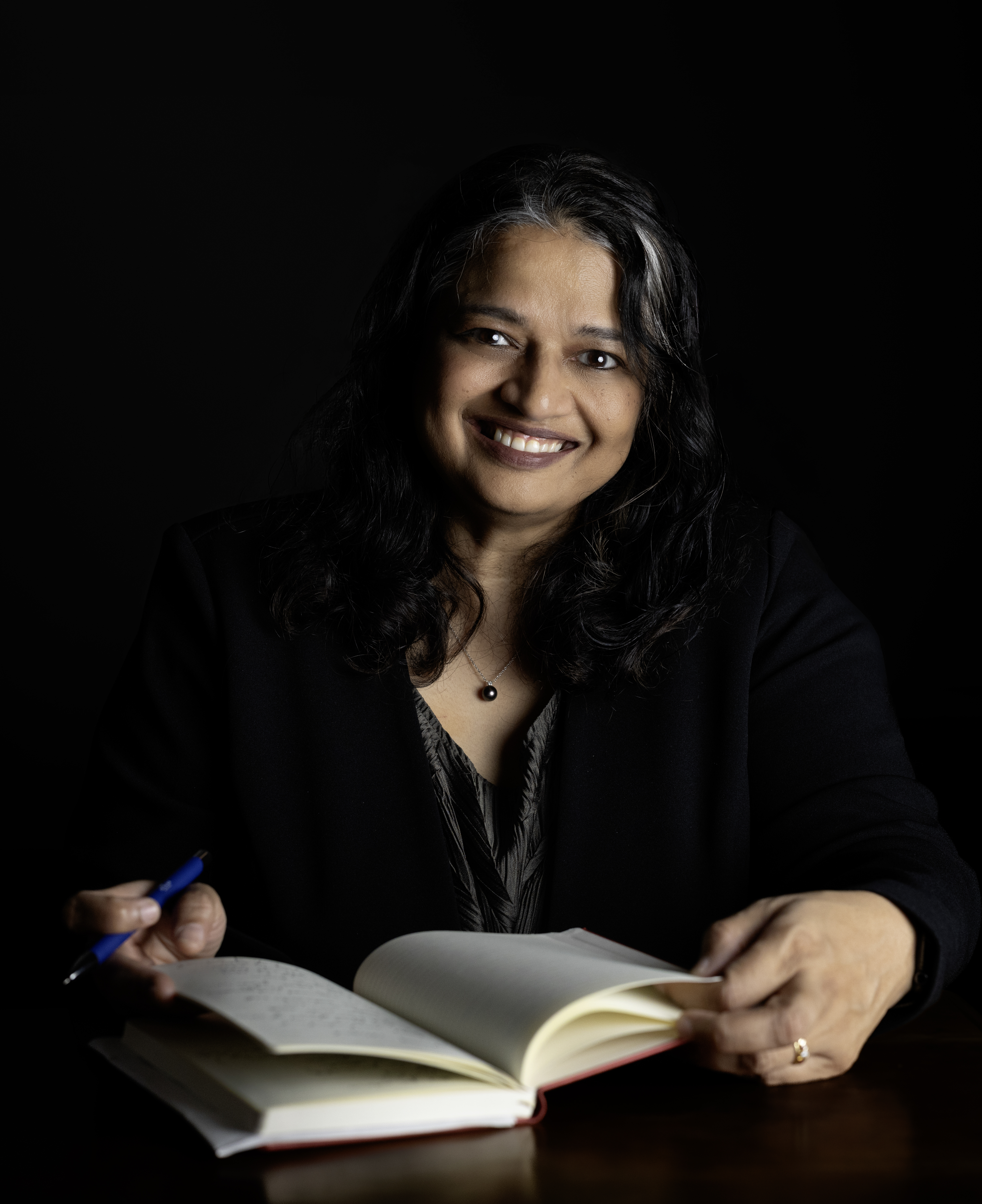
- Bala in 2025
- Born: 1971 (age 54–55); Bombay, India
- Education: Indian Institute of Technology at Bombay (BTech); Massachusetts Institute of Technology (MS, PhD)
- Scientific career
- Fields: Computer science
- Workplaces: Cornell University
- Thesis: Radiance interpolants for interactive scene editing and ray tracing (1999)
- Doctoral advisors: Julie Dorsey; Seth Teller

Kavita Bala (born 1971) is an Indian-American computer scientist. She is the 17th and current provost of Cornell University. She is a professor of computer science at Cornell. After serving as department chair from 2018–2020, she was appointed dean of the Faculty for Computing and Information Science, now known as the Cornell Ann S. Bowers College of Computing and Information Science.

== Education ==
Bala received a Bachelor of Technology (B.Tech.) from the Indian Institute of Technology at Bombay in 1992, and a Master of Science (S.M.) and a Ph.D. in computer science from the Massachusetts Institute of Technology in 1999.

== Career ==
At Cornell University, Bala became a postdoctoral researcher in the program of computer graphics led by Donald P. Greenberg in 1999, and joined the Cornell Computer Science faculty in 2002.

Bala co-founded GrokStyle with Sean Bell, a research scientist at Facebook. GrokStyle, a visual recognition AI company, began as a vision search and shopping tool integrated with IKEA's Augmented Reality application, and was subsequently acquired by Facebook in 2019. The technology was later used to develop Facebook's own GrokNet, which allows users to buy and sell items across all of Facebook platforms.

Bala has been on the Board of Directors for the American nonprofit for minority students in computer science, ColorStack, the Board of Trustees of Toyota Technological Institute at Chicago, the Advisory Board for ACM Transactions on Graphics, and the Papers Advisory Group for ACM SIGGRAPH. Bala also worked in research community including roles as the Technical Papers Chair of SIGGRAPH Asia 2011, and Editor-in-Chief of ACM Transactions on Graphics from 2015 to 2018.

== Research ==
Bala's primary research focus is on computer vision and graphics. Her work was recognized in 2020 by the special interest group on computer graphics, ACM SIGGRAPH, for "fundamental contributions to physically-based and scalable rendering, material modeling, perception for graphics, and visual recognition." Her early research focused on realistic, physically-based rendering and includes seminal work on scalable rendering, notably the development of Lightcuts and other approximate illumination algorithms, as well as contributions to volumetric and procedural modeling of textiles. Currently, Bala is studying recognition of materials, styles, and other object attributes in images. Her work on 3D Mandalas was featured at the Rubin Museum of Art, New York.

Bala's early research focused on realistic, physically-based rendering and scalable rendering, including the development of Lightcuts and other approximate illumination algorithms. The Lightcuts algorithm became the core production engine in Autodesk's cloud renderer. She co-authored the book Advanced Global Illumination. She has also contributed to volumetric and procedural modeling of textiles, and her work has also been used in the perception in graphics.

A second thread in Bala's work involves recognition of materials, styles, and other object attributes in images. Her work on intrinsic images and material recognition using crowd-sourced training data has been influential, her work on style transfer has also received recognition, as she also did work on style recognition. This technology was used to power GrokStyle. Bala has also done recent work on worldwide analysis of fashion by analyzing image collections to uncover how cultural clothing trends vary around the world.

== Recognition ==
Bala was elected as an ACM Fellow in 2019 "for contributions to rendering and scene understanding". She was inducted into the SIGGRAPH Academy in 2020. She is the recipient of the SIGGRAPH Computer Graphics Achievement Award (2020), and the IIT Bombay Distinguished Alumnus Award in 2021.

== Personal life ==
Bala is married to Andrew Myers, also a computer science professor at Cornell.
