= Tomoyuki Nishita =

Japanese computer scientist

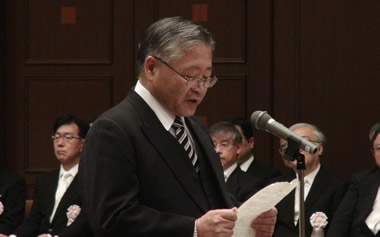

Tomoyuki Nishita (西田 友是, Nishita Tomoyuki; born 1949 in Hiroshima, Japan) is a professor at the University of Tokyo. Dr. Nishita received a research award for computer graphics from the Information Processing Society of Japan in 1987, and also received the Steven Anson Coons Award from the ACM SIGGRAPH in 2005.

He is one of the pioneers of the method of radiosity (also soft shadows). His research on computer graphics includes lighting simulation, rendering, shading, natural phenomena, curved surface, non-photorealistic rendering (NPR), morphing, interactive rendering, and WebGraphics.

Nishita received his BE, ME and Ph.D in engineering in 1971, 1973, and 1985, respectively, from Hiroshima University. He worked at Fukuyama University from 1979 to 1998. He was an associate researcher in the Engineering Computer Graphics Laboratory at Brigham Young University from 1988 to 1989. He has lectured at the University of Tokyo since 1994, and has been a professor in the Department of Complexity Science and Engineering at the university since 1998. He has written 23 SIGGRAPH papers and 18 EUROGRAPHICS papers.

He was a member of the editorial board of the IEEE Transactions on Visualization and Computer Graphics. He was a president of the IIEEJ (Institute of Image and Electronics Engineers of Japan).
