= Felix Heide =

Computer scientist working primarily in the fields of computational imaging

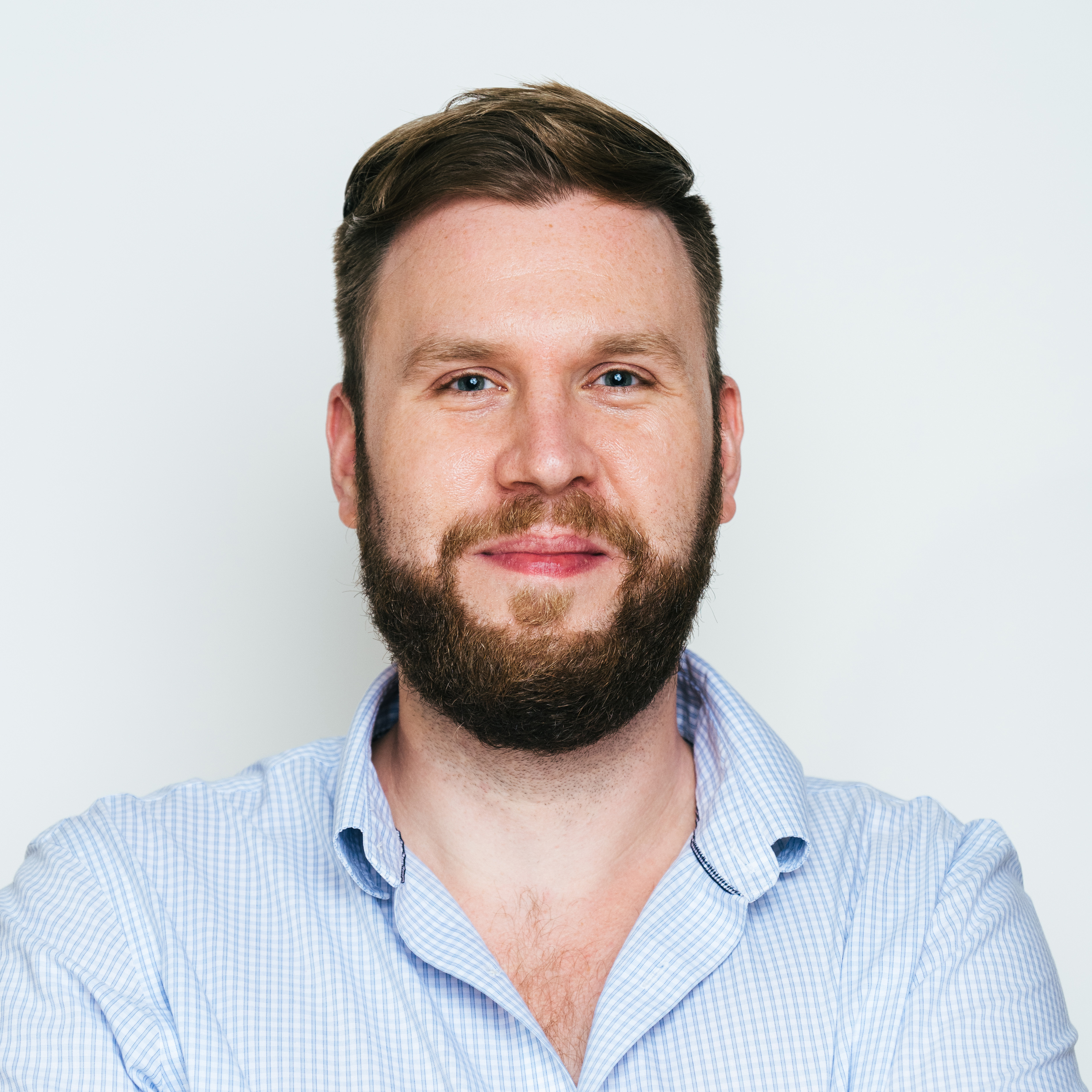
- Education: University of British Columbia (PhD); Stanford University (Postdoc)
- Known for: Computational imaging
- Awards: Alain Fournier Ph.D. Dissertation Award (2016); ACM SIGGRAPH Outstanding Doctoral Dissertation Award (2017); AutoSens Young Engineer of the Year (2020); ACM SIGGRAPH Significant New Researcher Award (2023)
- Scientific career
- Workplaces: Stanford University; Algolux; Princeton University
- Thesis: Structure-aware Computational Imaging (2016)
- Doctoral advisor: Wolfgang Heidrich
- Website: www.cs.princeton.edu/~fheide/

Felix Heide is a German-born computer scientist known for his work in the fields of computational imaging, computer vision, computer graphics and deep learning. He is an assistant professor at Princeton University and was the head of the Computational Imaging Lab. He serves as Head of Artificial Intelligence at Torc Robotics. Heide co-founded Algolux, a startup in computer vision technology for self-driving vehicles, which later merged with Torc Robotics.

== Education ==
Heide completed his undergraduate and Master's degree in computer science at the University of Siegen, where he graduated summa cum laude.

In 2016, he received his PhD from the University of British Columbia under the advisement of Professor Wolfgang Heidrich. His doctoral dissertation won the Alain Fournier PhD Dissertation Award for the best Canadian PhD dissertation in computer graphics and the ACM SIGGRAPH outstanding doctoral dissertation award for the best PhD dissertation in computer graphics and interactive techniques. Following his doctoral studies, he conducted postdoctoral research at Stanford University, with visiting research stints at institutions including the Massachusetts Institute of Technology (MIT) and King Abdullah University of Science and Technology (KAUST).

== Career ==
Heide is an assistant professor in the Computer Science Department at Princeton University, where he researches computational imaging, computer vision, and optics. His work explores end-to-end design of imaging, vision, and display systems, particularly those used in autonomous vehicle applications.

In 2015, Heide co-founded Algolux. Under his leadership, Algolux grew to over 100+ employees, raised venture capital, and shipped computer vision software that has been used worldwide by automotive manufacturers. Algolux later became part of Torc Robotics.

Heide has served as a technical advisory board member for Samsung Research and has held research and advisory roles with Nvidia, KAUST, and other institutions.

== Research ==
A central theme of Heide’s research is the integration of machine learning and optimization techniques with physical imaging systems. He explores how algorithms can be co-designed with optics and hardware to improve the quality, robustness, and efficiency of imaging under challenging conditions. This approach has resulted in novel methods for vision in adverse weather, low light, and occluded environments, which are critical for autonomous driving applications.

=== Computational imaging ===
Heide has pioneered methods that enhance image quality through innovative optics combined with computational processing. His research in this area includes developing neural nano-optics for compact, high-performance imaging systems, which hinge on differentiable camera models that allow for the joint optimization of optics and image processing algorithms. Neural nano-optics combine nanometer-scale metasurface optics with neural network-based image reconstruction to create high-quality imaging systems with wide field of view, chromatic aberration correction, and applications in fields like robotics and medicine.

Heide’s pioneering work on transient imaging and non-line-of-sight (NLOS) imaging has focused on advancing methods for capturing and reconstructing images of objects that are not directly visible to the camera.

=== End-to-end camera and vision systems ===
Heide's work in end-to-end design involves optimizing the entire imaging pipeline, from light capture to image reconstruction. This approach has applications in autonomous driving, where cameras need to perceive, act, and reconstruct complex environments. His research also explores novel display technologies, such as holography, which leverage computational techniques for high-fidelity visual output.

=== Machine learning for autonomous vehicle perception ===
In autonomous driving, perception is critical for safety and navigation. Heide's work has contributed significantly to developing perception systems that perform reliably in challenging conditions such as fog, rain, and low lighting. These methods have been integrated into vision software used by companies like Waymo, Cruise, and Google.

== Awards and recognitions ==
- Princeton Distinguished Innovation Award (2025)
- Photonics 100 (2024)
- SIGGRAPH Significant New Researcher Award (2023)
- Sloan Research Fellowship (2023)
- Packard Fellowship (2022)
- NSF CAREER Award (2021)
- Sony Faculty Innovation Award (2021)
- AutoSens Young Engineer of the Year (2020)

== Publications and patents ==
Heide has co-authored close to 50 publications and has received over 9,200 citations. In 2020, six of his papers were accepted to the Conference on Computer Vision and Pattern Recognition – including three orals. One of them, “Seeing Around Street Corners: Non-Line-of-Sight Detection and Tracking In-the-Wild Using Doppler Radar” was picked up by numerous publications.

Additionally, he has filed for 16 patents, and 7 of them have been granted as of yet. The last one, “Method and apparatus for joint image processing and perception” was granted in July 2020.
