= Nelson Max =

American computer scientist

Nelson Max is a professor of computer science at the University of California, Davis. He received his Ph.D. in Mathematics from Harvard University in 1967, advised by Herman Gluck. His research interests include scientific visualization, computer animation, photorealistic computer graphics rendering, multi-view stereo reconstruction, and augmented reality. In his visualization section, he worked on molecular graphics, and volume and flow visualization, particularly on irregular finite element meshes. He has rendered realistic lighting effects in clouds, trees, and water waves, and has produced numerous computer animations, shown at the annual ACM SIGGRAPH conferences, and in OMNIMAX stereo at the Fujitsu Pavilions at Expo ’85 in Tsukuba Japan, and at Expo ’90 in Osaka Japan. He received the prestigious Steven A. Coons Award in 2007, and is a Fellow of the ACM and a member of the ACM SIGGRAPH Academy.

His computer animation in the early 1970s for the Topology Films Project included the award winning animated films "Space Filling Curves," showing continuous fractal curves that pass through every point in a square, and "Turning a Sphere Inside Out," showing how to turn a sphere inside out without tearing or creasing the surface, but allowing the surface to cross itself. In photorealistic rendering, he was the first to render beams of light and shadow from atmospheric scattering, and developed horizon mapping to render bump shadows on bump-mapped surfaces. At Lawrence Livermore National Laboratory in 1981, he produced the film "Carla's Island" showing reflections of the sunset on ocean waves, using vectorized ray tracing on the Cray 1 supercomputer.
