= IEEE Transactions on Visualization and Computer Graphics =

- Discipline: Visualization, computer graphics, virtual reality
- Language: English
- Edited by: Klaus Mueller

Publication details
- History: 1995–present
- Publisher: IEEE Computer Society
- Frequency: Monthly
- Open access: Hybrid
- Impact factor: 4.579 (2020)

Standard abbreviations
- ISO 4: IEEE Trans. Vis. Comput. Graph.

Indexing
- ISSN: 1077-2626
- OCLC no.: 30748801

Links
- Journal homepage

IEEE Transactions on Visualization and Computer Graphics is a peer-reviewed scientific journal published by the IEEE Computer Society. It covers subjects related to computer graphics and visualization techniques, systems, software, hardware, and user interface issues. TVCG has been considered the top journal in the field of visualization.

Since 2011, TVCG has allowed authors to present recently accepted papers at partner conferences. These include:

- IEEE Visualization (VIS), including VAST, InfoVis, and SciVis.
- IEEE Virtual Reality Conference (IEEE VR)
- IEEE International Symposium on Mixed and Augmented Reality (ISMAR)
- ACM Symposium on Interactive 3D Graphics and Games (I3D)
- IEEE Pacific Visualization Conference (IEEE PacificVis)
- ACM SIGGRAPH/Eurographics Symposium on Computer Animation (SCA)
- Eurographics Symposium on Geometry Processing (SGP)
- Pacific Graphics Conference (PG)
- Eurovis - The EG and VGTC Conference on Visualization
- Graphics Interfaces (GI)
