= Irene Greif =

American computer scientist

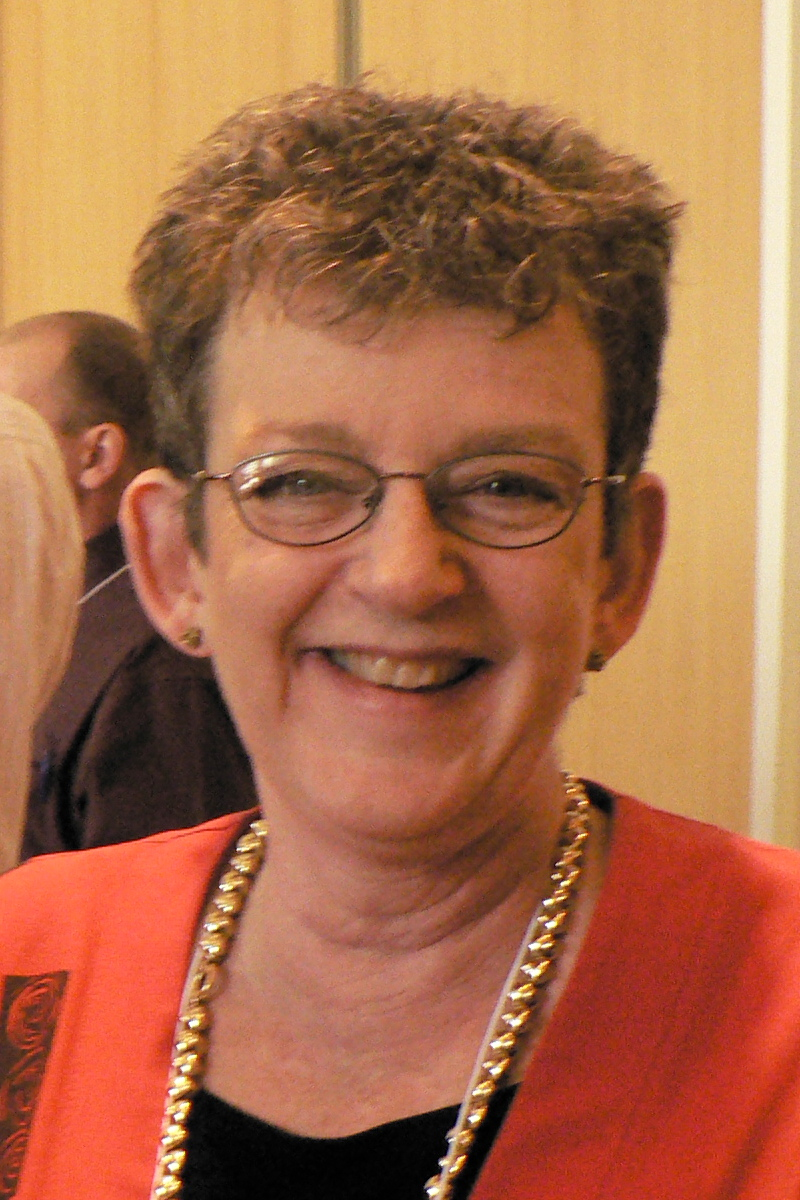
- Greif in 2009
- Occupation: Computer scientist
- Spouse: Albert R. Meyer

Academic background
- Education: MIT

Academic work
- Discipline: Computer Science
- Institutions: University of Washington, MIT

Irene Greif is an American computer scientist and a founder of the field of computer-supported cooperative work (CSCW). She was the first woman to earn a Ph.D. in computer science from the Massachusetts Institute of Technology.

== Early life and education ==
Greif's mother was an accountant, and a native of New York City. Greif has at least one sibling, a sister. She attended Hunter College High School before earning her undergraduate and graduate degrees from MIT. In 1975, Greif became the first woman to earn a Ph.D. in computer science from MIT; in her dissertation of that year, she published the first operational actor model.

== Career ==
She was a professor of computer science at the University of Washington before returning to MIT as a professor of electrical engineering and computer science (1977–87). In 1984, Greif and Paul Cashman coined the term "Computer Supported Cooperative Work" and the initials, CSCW, at an interdisciplinary workshop in Cambridge, Massachusetts. Preferring research over teaching, she left academia in 1987 to join Lotus, where she directed its Product Design Group, and created the Lotus Research group in 1992. After Lotus was acquired by IBM, she became an IBM Fellow and served as director of collaborative user experience in the company's Thomas J. Watson Research Center. Greif retired from IBM in 2013.

Greif is a Fellow of the American Academy of Arts and Sciences (AAAS) and the Association for Computing Machinery (ACM); she is also a member of the National Academy of Engineering. Her awards include Women in Technology International Hall of Fame inductee (2000), Women Entrepreneurs in Science and Technology Leadership Award (2008), and ABIE Award for Technical Leadership from the Anita Borg Institute (2012).

Greif is featured in the Notable Women in Computing cards.

== Personal life ==
Greif is married to Albert R. Meyer, the Hitachi America Professor of Computer Science at MIT. Greif, who is Jewish, has a son and daughter, as well as two step-children, and lives in Newton Centre, Massachusetts.

== Selected works ==
- 1975, Semantics of communicating parallel processes
- 1980, Programs for distributed computing : the calendar application
- 1982, Cooperative office work, teleconferencing and calendar management : a collection of papers
- 1983, Software for the 'roles' people play
- 1988, Computer-supported cooperative work : a book of readings
