= Jessica Hodgins =

American roboticist and computer scientist

- Education: Yale University; Carnegie Mellon University
- Spouse: Christopher G. Atkeson
- Awards: National Science Foundation Young Investigator Award; Packard Fellowship; Sloan Research Fellowship; Steven A. Coons Award
- Scientific career
- Fields: Robotics, computer science, computer graphics
- Workplaces: Georgia Institute of Technology; Carnegie Mellon University; Disney Research
- Thesis: Legged robots on rough terrain : experiments in adjusting step length (1989)
- Doctoral advisor: Marc Raibert

Jessica K. Hodgins is an American roboticist and researcher who is a professor at Carnegie Mellon's Robotics Institute and School of Computer Science. She is currently VP, Strategic Projects & Research at the RAI Institute in Boston. She was elected the president of ACM SIGGRAPH in 2017. Until 2016, she was Vice President of Research at Disney Research and was the Director of the Disney Research labs in Pittsburgh and Los Angeles. Hodgins also founded the Facebook AI Research lab in Pittsburgh next to Carnegie Mellon.

== Early life and education ==
Jessica Hodgins was born in Urbana, Illinois to Audrey and Frank Hodgins. Audrey was an educator whose work was published in numerous journals and magazines. Frank is the namesake of the Frank Hodgins Fellowship Fund for graduate students in English at the University of Illinois. Hodgins attended Urbana High School. She earned a BA in mathematics from Yale University, and went on to receive her PhD in computer science from Carnegie Mellon University in 1989.

== Career ==
Hodgins was Associate Professor and Assistant Dean in the College of Computing at Georgia Institute of Technology from 1998 to 2000. She has been a professor at Carnegie Mellon University since 2000.

She was Editor in Chief of ACM Transactions on Graphics from 2000 to 2002, and she served as Papers Chair for ACM SIGGRAPH in 2003. She was elected the president of ACM SIGGRAPH in 2017. Prior to being elected president, she served as director at large from 2009 to 2017.

=== Disney Research ===
Hodgins joined Disney Research in 2008 and founded the Disney Research Pittsburgh lab. Much of her research there has been focused on motion capture and computer animation technologies. In 2012 she was part of a team that developed and demonstrated a technique for motion-capture acting to be performed with a single camera and no markers.

=== Facebook AI Research Lab ===
Beginning in summer 2018, Hodgins is on partial leave from CMU to build a Facebook AI Research Lab located in Pittsburgh.

=== RAI Institute ===
In 2022, Hodgins joined the RAI institute as VP, Strategic Projects & Research. She "oversees strategic projects at the Institute and supports research teams in foundation models, data capture, ethics and society, and humanoids."

== Awards ==
Hodgins has received a NSF Young Investigator Award, a Packard Fellowship, and a Sloan Fellowship.

In 2010, she was awarded the ACM SIGGRAPH Computer Graphics Achievement Award.

In 2017 she was awarded the ACM SIGGRAPH Steven A. Coons Award.

Hodgins was elected as an ACM Fellow in 2018 for "contributions to character animation, human simulation, and humanoid robotics".
