= Kurt Akeley =

American computer graphics engineer

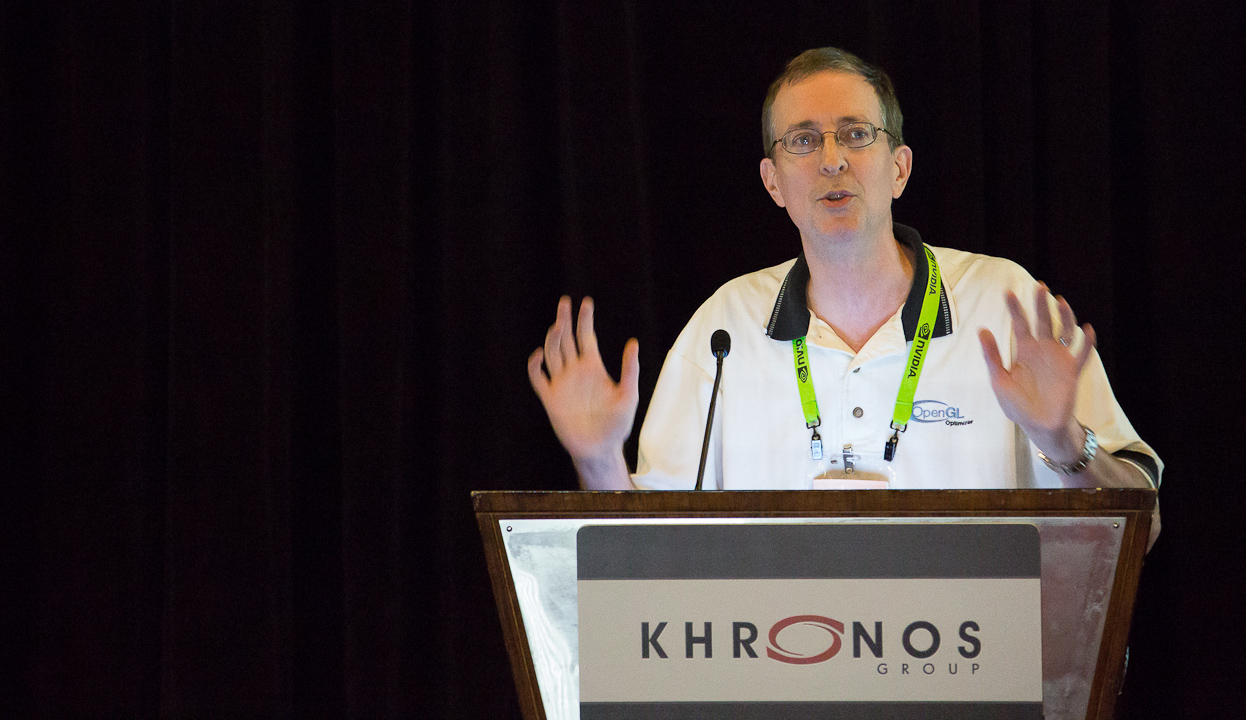
- Akeley at SIGGRAPH 2012
- Born: Kurt Akeley; June 8, 1958 (age 68); United States
- Education: University of Delaware (B.E.E.) Stanford University (M.S.E.E.)

Kurt Akeley (born June 8, 1958) is an American computer graphics engineer.

Akeley was elected into the National Academy of Engineering in 2005 for contributions to the architecture of 3-D graphics systems and the definition of Open GL, now the industry standard.

== Biography ==
Kurt Akeley received a B.E.E. from the University of Delaware in 1980, and an M.S.E.E. from Stanford University in 1982. That year, he joined with Jim Clark in the founding team of Silicon Graphics, Incorporated (later renamed SGI).

Akeley developed the frame buffers and processor subsystems for the early SGI IRIS series products and many of the CAD tools used to design these and other products. Akeley was instrumental in developing the graphics systems for the Power Series and Onyx systems, including the GTX, the VGX, and the RealityEngine. Akeley also led the design and documentation of the OpenGL graphics software specification, which was supported by Silicon Graphics and many other workstation and personal computer vendors.

In 1984, Akeley's colleagues at Silicon Graphics recognized his contributions by selecting him as the first overall Spirit of SGI award winner. Akeley later became Chief Engineer and then Vice President at SGI.

After leaving SGI in 2001, Akeley resumed his studies at Stanford University in the Stanford Computer Graphics Lab researching 3D display technology and earned a PhD in electrical engineering in 2004.

During this time, Akeley consulted at NVIDIA and collaborated on the design of the Cg hardware shading languages for GPUs. He was also the editor (i.e., the paper chair) for the SIGGRAPH 2000 conference proceedings and a principal researcher at Microsoft Research's Silicon Valley lab. In September 2010 he became the CTO of a Silicon Valley start-up, Lytro.

== Awards ==
Akeley received the 1993 Distinguished Alumnus award from the Department of Electrical Engineering of the University of Delaware and was given a University of Delaware Presidential Citation for Outstanding Achievement in 1995.

Akeley received the 1995 SIGGRAPH Computer Graphics Achievement Award in recognition of his contributions to the architecture, design, and realization of high performance 3D graphics hardware systems.

In 1996, Akeley was inducted as a Fellow of the Association for Computing Machinery.

He is a member of the National Academy of Engineering.

== Publications ==
- Kurt Akeley and Tom Jermoluk, High-Performance Polygon Rendering, SIGGRAPH '88 Conference Proceedings, pp. 239–246.
- Kurt Akeley, The Silicon Graphics 4D/240GTX Superworkstation, IEEE Computer Graphics and Applications, July 1989, pp. 71–83.
- Paul Haeberli and Kurt Akeley, The Accumulation Buffer: Hardware Support for High-Quality Rendering, SIGGRAPH '90 Conference Proceedings, pp. 309–318.
- Kurt Akeley, "Issues and Directions for Graphics Hardware Accelerators", Rendering, Visualization and Rasterization Hardware (Eurographics'91 Workshop) in Advances in Computer Graphics Hardware VI, Springer, 1993.
- Mark Segal and Kurt Akeley, The OpenGL Graphics System: A Specification, Silicon Graphics, Inc., 1992.
- Kurt Akeley, RealityEngine Graphics, SIGGRAPH '93 Conference Proceedings, pp. 109–116.
- William R. Mark, R. Steven Glanville, Kurt Akeley, Mark J. Kilgard, Cg: A System for Programming Graphics Hardware in a C-like Language, Proceedings of SIGGRAPH 2003.
- Kurt Akeley, Simon J. Watt, Ahna Reza Girshick, and Martin S. Banks, A stereo display prototype with multiple focal distances, ACM Transactions on Graphics, August 2004.
