= Christopher G. Atkeson =

American roboticist

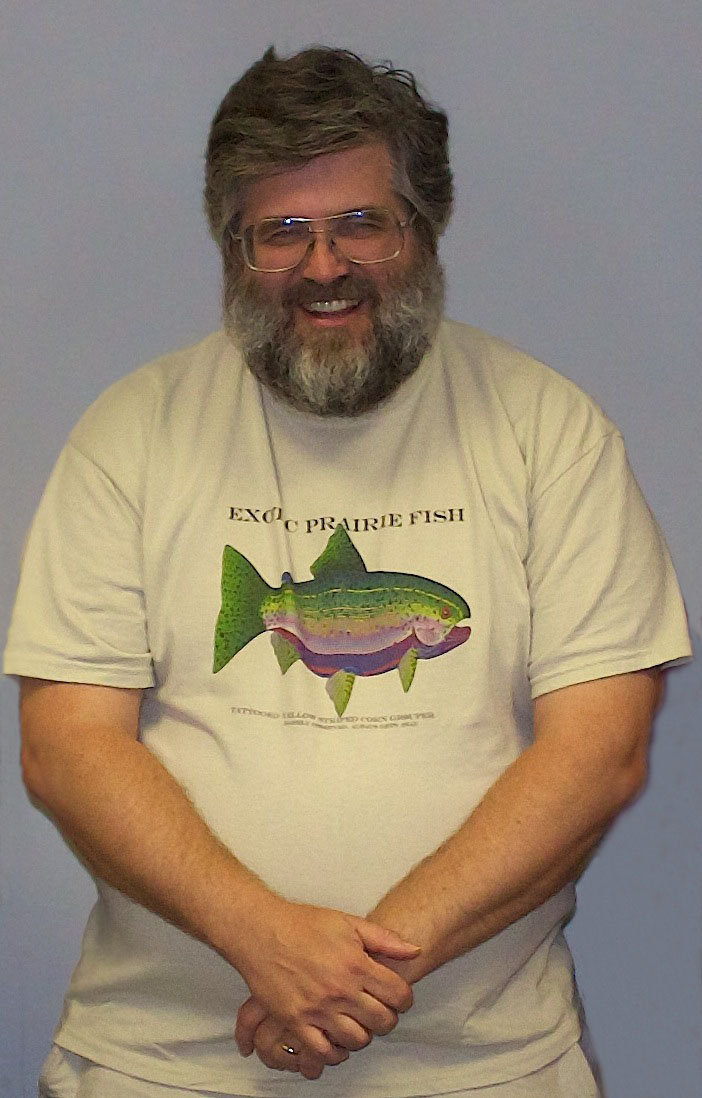
- Born: 28 May 1959 (age 67)
- Education: Massachusetts Institute of Technology; Harvard University
- Spouse: Jessica Hodgins
- Scientific career
- Fields: Robotics and Machine Learning
- Workplaces: Carnegie Mellon University; Georgia Institute of Technology; Massachusetts Institute of Technology
- Thesis: Roles of knowledge in motor learning (1986)
- Doctoral advisor: Emilio Bizzi

Christopher Granger Atkeson (born 28 May 1959) is an American roboticist and a professor at the Robotics Institute and Human-Computer Interaction Institute at Carnegie Mellon University (CMU). Atkeson is known for his work in humanoid robots, soft robotics, and machine learning, most notably on locally weighted learning.

== Early life and education ==
Atkeson graduated summa cum laude from Harvard University in 1981 with an A.B. in biochemistry. He received his S.M. degree in applied mathematics in the same year, also from Harvard. He then attended the Massachusetts Institute of Technology and received his PhD in brain and cognitive science from them in 1986, advised by Emilio Bizzi.

== Career ==
Before joining the faculty at CMU in 2000, he was an assistant, then associate professor in the department of Brain and Cognitive Sciences at MIT from 1986 to 1993. He was also an associate professor at the College of Computing, Georgia Institute of Technology from 1994 to 2000.

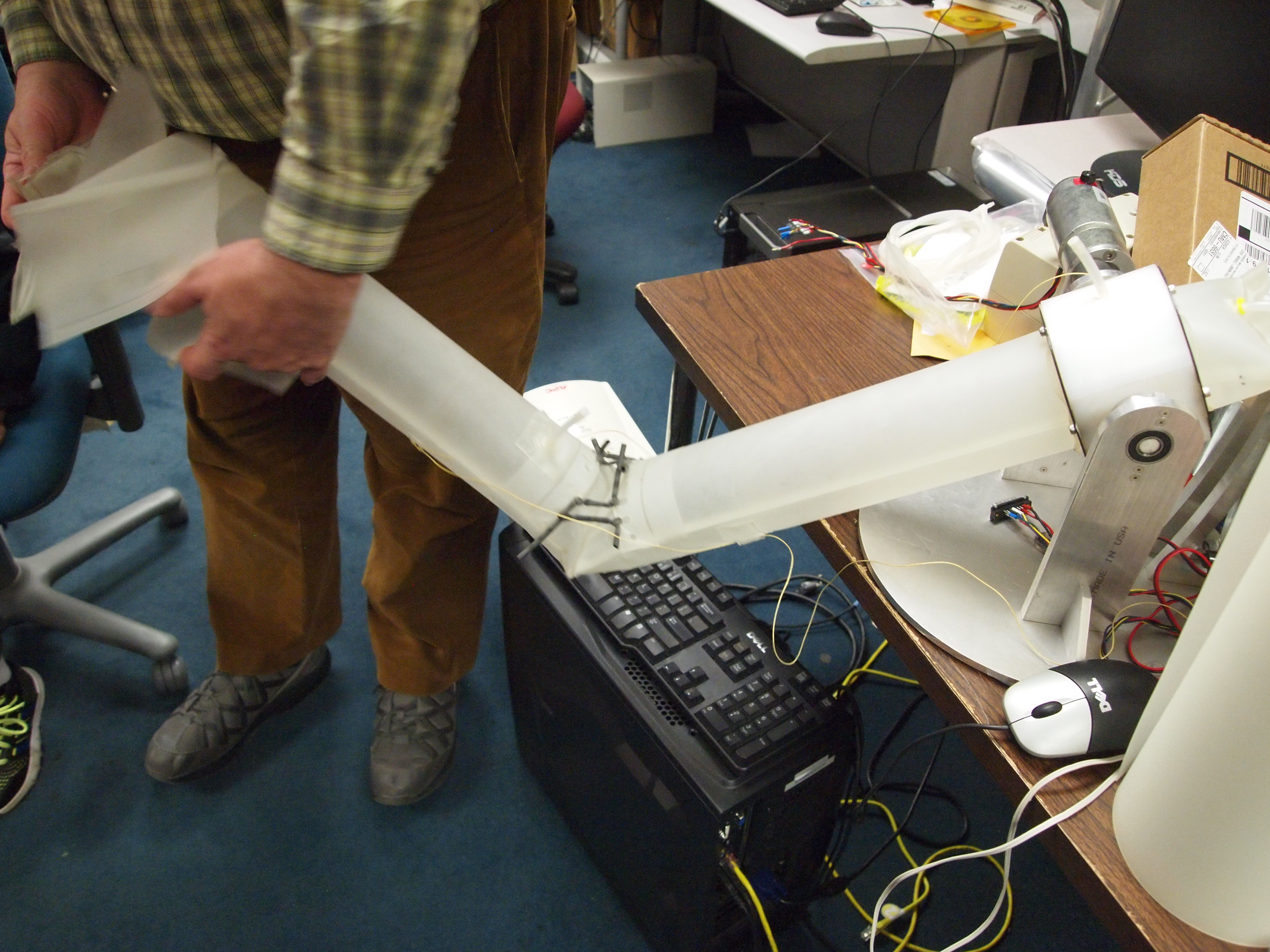
Chris Atkeson's robot that inspired the creation of Baymax

Atkeson's work in soft robotics helped influence production on the 2014 Disney film Big Hero 6, and he consulted with the film's production team on the design of Baymax.

== Honors and awards ==
- National Science Foundation Engineering Initiation Award, 1987–1988.
- National Science Foundation Presidential Young Investigator Award, 1988–1993.
- W. M. Keck Foundation Assistant Professorship in Biomedical Engineering, 1988–1990.
- Alfred P. Sloan Research Fellow, 1989–1991.
- W. M. Keck Foundation Associate Professorship in Biomedical Engineering, 1990–1991.
- Teaching Award from the MIT Graduate Student Council, 1990.
- Edenfield Faculty Fellowship Award, 1995.
- Elected by faculty to College of Computing Dean's Advisory Committee, 1995–1996, 1996–1997.
- Finalist, Best Paper Award, ICRA 2000.

== Personal life ==
Atkeson is married to Jessica Hodgins, Professor of Computer Science and Robotics at CMU, and former director of Disney Research, Pittsburgh.
