= Jim Blinn =

American computer scientist

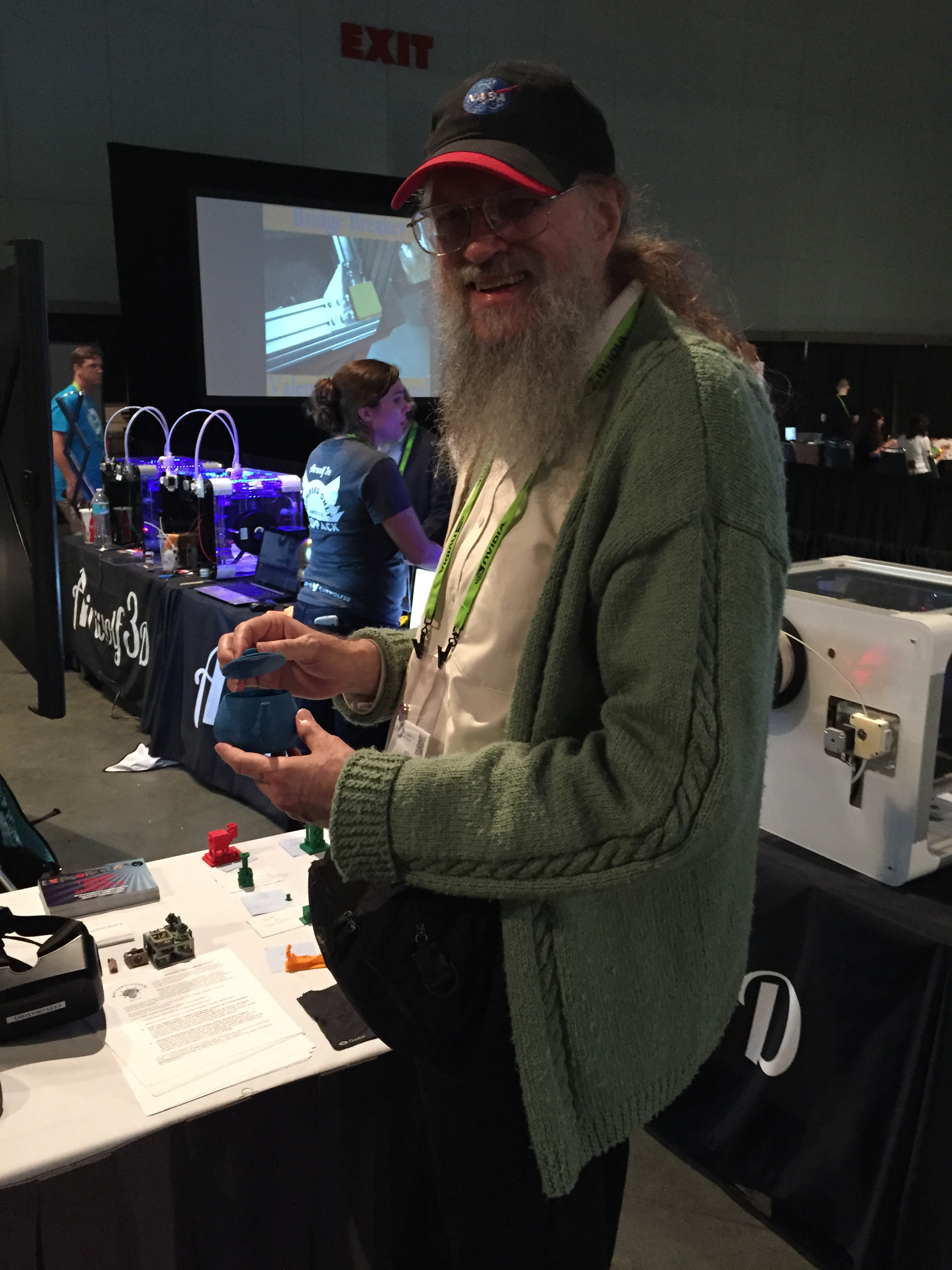
- Jim Blinn with 3D printed teapot, 2015
- Born: 1949 (age 76–77)
- Education: University of Utah; University of Michigan
- Awards: Macarthur fellowship (1991); NASA Exceptional Service Medal
- Scientific career
- Fields: Computer science
- Workplaces: NASA's Jet Propulsion Laboratory; New York Institute of Technology; Microsoft Research

James F. Blinn (born 1949) is an American computer scientist who first became widely known for his work as a computer graphics expert at NASA's Jet Propulsion Laboratory (JPL), particularly his work on the pre-encounter animations for the Voyager project, his work on the 1980 Carl Sagan documentary series Cosmos, and the research of the Blinn–Phong shading model.

In 2000, Blinn was elected a member of the National Academy of Engineering for contributions to the technology of educational use of computer graphics and for expository articles.

He is credited with formulating Blinn's Law, which asserts that rendering time tends to remain constant, even as computers get faster. Animators prefer to improve quality, rendering more complex scenes with more sophisticated algorithms, rather than using less time to do the same work as before.

== Biography ==
In 1970, he received his bachelor's degree in physics and communications science, and later a master's degree in engineering from the University of Michigan. In 1978 he received a Ph.D. in computer science from the College of Engineering at the University of Utah.

Blinn devised new methods to represent how objects and light interact in a three-dimensional virtual world, like environment mapping and bump mapping. He is well known for creating animation for three television series: Carl Sagan's Cosmos: A Personal Voyage; Project MATHEMATICS!; and the pioneering instructional graphics in The Mechanical Universe. His simulations of the Voyager spacecraft visiting Jupiter and Saturn have been seen widely.

Blinn was affiliated with the Jet Propulsion Laboratory at the California Institute of Technology until 1995. Thereafter, he joined Microsoft Research, where he was a graphics fellow until his retirement in 2009. Blinn also worked at the New York Institute of Technology.

== Jim Blinn's Corner ==
From 1987 to 2007, Blinn wrote a column for IEEE Computer Graphics & Applications called "Jim Blinn's Corner". He wrote a total of 83 columns, most of which were reprinted in these books:

- Blinn, James F.: Jim Blinn's Corner: Dirty Pixels, Morgan Kaufmann Publishers, Inc., ISBN 1-55860-455-3
- Blinn, James F.: Jim Blinn's Corner: A Trip Down The Graphics Pipeline, Morgan Kaufmann Publishers, Inc., ISBN 1-55860-387-5
- Blinn, James F.: Jim Blinn's Corner: Notation, Notation, Notation, Morgan Kaufmann Publishers, Inc., ISBN 1-55860-860-5

== Select publications ==
- Blinn, James F.: Simulation of Wrinkled Surfaces, Computer Graphics, Vol. 12 (3), pp. 286–292 SIGGRAPH-ACM (August 1978)
- Blinn, James F.: Texture and Reflection In Computer Generated Images, CACM, 19(10), October 1976, pp 542–547.
- Blinn, James F.: Models of Light Reflection for Computer Synthesized Pictures, SIGGRAPH 77, pp 192–198.
- Blinn, James F.: A Generalization of Algebraic Surface Drawing, ACM Transactions on Graphics, 1(3), July 1982, pp 235–256.
- Blinn, James F.: Light Reflection Functions for the Simulation of Clouds and Dusty Surfaces, SIGGRAPH 82, pp 21–29.

== Awards ==
- 1983, NASA Exceptional Service medal for Voyager Fly-by animation.
- 1983, SIGGRAPH Computer Graphics Achievement Award.
- 1989, IEEE Outstanding Contribution Award for Jim Blinn's Corner.
- 1991, MacArthur Fellowship in recognition of and to allow continuation of his work in educational animation.
- 1995, Honorary Doctor of Fine Arts degree from the Parsons School of Design for contributions to computer graphics.
- 1999, Steven A. Coons Award for Outstanding Creative Contributions to Computer Graphics.
- 2000, Elected to the National Academy of Engineering

== See also ==
- Metaballs
