= Wolfgang Heidrich =

German-Canadian Computer Scientist

- Born: November 3, 1968 (age 57)
- Education: University of Erlangen–Nuremberg, University of Waterloo
- Awards: ACM Fellow (2025), Optica Fellow (2025), NAI Fellow (2024), ACM SIGGRAPH Computer Graphics Achievement Award (2023), IEEE Fellow (2021), Alexander von Humboldt Foundation Humboldt Research Award (2014), Eurographics Fellow 2013, UBC Charles A. McDowell Award for Excellence in Research (2011), Peter Wall Institute for Advanced Studies Early Career Scholar (2002)
- Scientific career
- Fields: Computational Imaging, Computer Graphics, Computer Vision, Image Processing, Inverse Problems
- Workplaces: King Abdullah University of Science and Technology University of British Columbia
- Doctoral advisor: Hans-Peter Seidel

Wolfgang Heidrich (born November 3, 1968) is a German-Canadian computer scientist and Professor at the King Abdullah University of Science and Technology (KAUST), for which he served as the director of Visual Computing Center from 2014 to 2021. He was previously a professor at the University of British Columbia (UBC), where he was a Dolby Research Chair (2008-2013). His research has combined methods from computer graphics, optics, machine vision, imaging, inverse methods, and perception to develop new Computational Imaging and Display technologies. His more recent interest focuses on hardware-software co-design of the next generation of imaging systems, with applications such as high dynamic range (HDR) imaging, compact computational cameras, hyper-spectral cameras, wavefront sensors, to name just a few.

Heidrich is best known for his work in developing the high dynamic range (HDR) imaging and displays, which served as the basis for the technology behind Brightside Technologies, which was acquired by Dolby in 2007, and then later on (as part of the Dolby vision) turned into one of the core technical solutions for commercial displays.

In 2010, Heidrich, along with Erik Reinhard, Paul Debevec, Sumanta Pattanaik, Greg Ward, and Karol Myszkowsk, published the book High Dynamic Range Imaging: Acquisition, Display, and Image-Based Lighting, that later on became an essential resource for people working with images.

Heidrich has been elected a Fellow of the National Academy of Inventors, ACM, Optica, IEEE, Eurographics, and AAIA. He is the recipient of the ACM SIGGRAPH Computer Graphics Achievement Award (2023), the Humboldt Research Award (2014), the Charles A. McDowell Award for Excellence in Research (2011), an NSERC Discovery Accelerator Supplement (2010), and the Peter Wall Institute for Advanced Studies Early Career Scholar Award (2002).

== Biography ==
Heidrich received his Diplom informatiker from University of Erlangen (1995), an M.Math in computer science from University of Waterloo (1996), and a PhD (with honours) in computer science from University of Erlangen (1999). Before joining UBC, he was a Research Associate at Max-Planck-Institute for Computer Science (1999-2000). Then, he became a faculty member at the University of British Columbia (UBC) computer science (2000-2018). Since 2014, he has been affiliated with King Abdullah University of Science and Technology (KAUST) CS and ECE.
