= David Kirk (scientist) =

American computer scientist (born 1960)

David Blair Kirk (born 1960) is a computer scientist and former chief scientist and vice president of architecture at NVIDIA. As of 2019, he is a Venture Partner at DigitalDx Ventures, and an independent consultant and advisor.

Kirk holds B.S. and M.S. degrees in Mechanical Engineering from the Massachusetts Institute of Technology and M.S. and Ph.D. degrees in Computer Science from the California Institute of Technology. From 1989 to 1991, Kirk was an engineer for Apollo Systems Division of Hewlett-Packard. From 1993 to 1996, Kirk was Chief Scientist and Head of Technology for Crystal Dynamics, a video game manufacturing company. From 1997 to 2009 he was NVIDIA's chief scientist and he is an NVIDIA Fellow.

In 2002, Kirk received the ACM SIGGRAPH Computer Graphics Achievement Award for his significant contributions to bringing high performance graphics hardware to the mass market. In 2006, Kirk was elected a member of the National Academy of Engineering for his role in bringing high-performance graphics to personal computers.

Kirk is the inventor of 50 patents and patent applications relating to graphics design and underlying graphics algorithms.

== Books ==
- David B. Kirk; Wen-mei W. Hwu (2012). Programming Massively Parallel Processors: A Hands-on Approach (2nd ed.). Elsevier/Morgan Kaufmann. ISBN 978-0-12-391418-7.
