= Henry Fuchs =

American computer graphics researcher (born 1948)

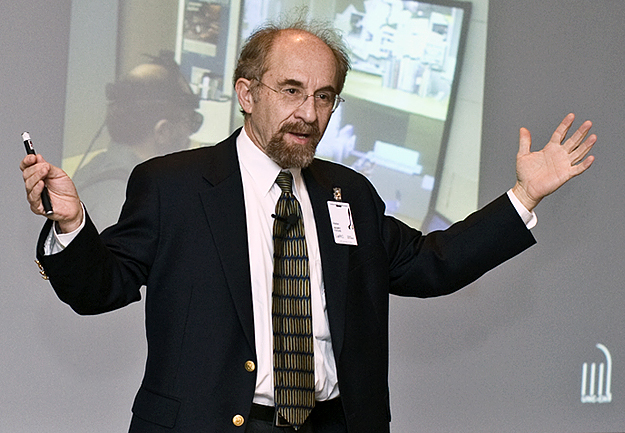
- Fuchs speaking at NASA Langley in 2009.
- Born: 20 January 1948 (age 78); Tokaj, Hungary
- Citizenship: American
- Education: University of Utah
- Known for: Binary space partitioning Pixel-Planes architecture
- Awards: Fellow of the AAAS; Fellow of the ACM; Member of the NAE; ACM SIGGRAPH Achievement Award; Steven Anson Coons Award
- Scientific career
- Fields: Computer scientist Biomedical engineer
- Workplaces: UNC; UT Dallas
- Thesis: The Automatic Sensing and Analysis of Three-Dimensional Surface Points from Visual Scenes (1975)
- Doctoral advisor: Robert P. Plummer
- Doctoral students: Marc Levoy; Greg Turk; Ramesh Raskar

Henry Fuchs (born 20 January 1948) is an American computer scientist and pioneer in 3D computer graphics. He is best known for leading the Pixel-Planes and PixelFlow parallel rendering architectures, which influenced the evolution of later graphics processing units (GPUs) and anticipated features such as per-pixel processing and interactive programmable shading. He is also known for co-developing Binary Space Partitioning (BSP) trees and his significant contributions to virtual reality (VR), augmented reality (AR),telepresence/tele-immersion, and their medical applications. He is the Federico Gil Distinguished Professor of Computer Science at the University of North Carolina at Chapel Hill (UNC), where he also serves as an adjunct professor in biomedical engineering.

Fuchs is a member of the National Academy of Engineering (NAE), a fellow of the American Academy of Arts and Sciences, a life fellow of the Institute of Electrical and Electronics Engineers (IEEE), a fellow of the Association for Computing Machinery (ACM), and a fellow of European Association for Computer Graphics (Eurographics). His contributions have been recognized with numerous awards including the ACM SIGGRAPH Steven A. Coons Award, the IEEE Virtual Reality Career Award, and the ACM SIGGRAPH Computer Graphics Achievement Award; he was also inducted into the inaugural ACM SIGGRAPH Academy (2018), received an honorary doctorate from TU Wien (2018), and was named a Eurographics Fellow (2020). Fuchs has previously served as the technical program chairman for ACM SIGGRAPH, an associate editor and guest editor for ACM Transactions on Graphics (ToG), the Awards Chair for IEEE Visualization and Graphics Technical Community (VGTC), a member of the advisory committees for National Science Foundation (NSF), National Institutes of Health (NIH), and National Research Council (NRC), a member of the steering committee for IEEE International Symposium on Mixed and Augmented Realities (ISMAR).

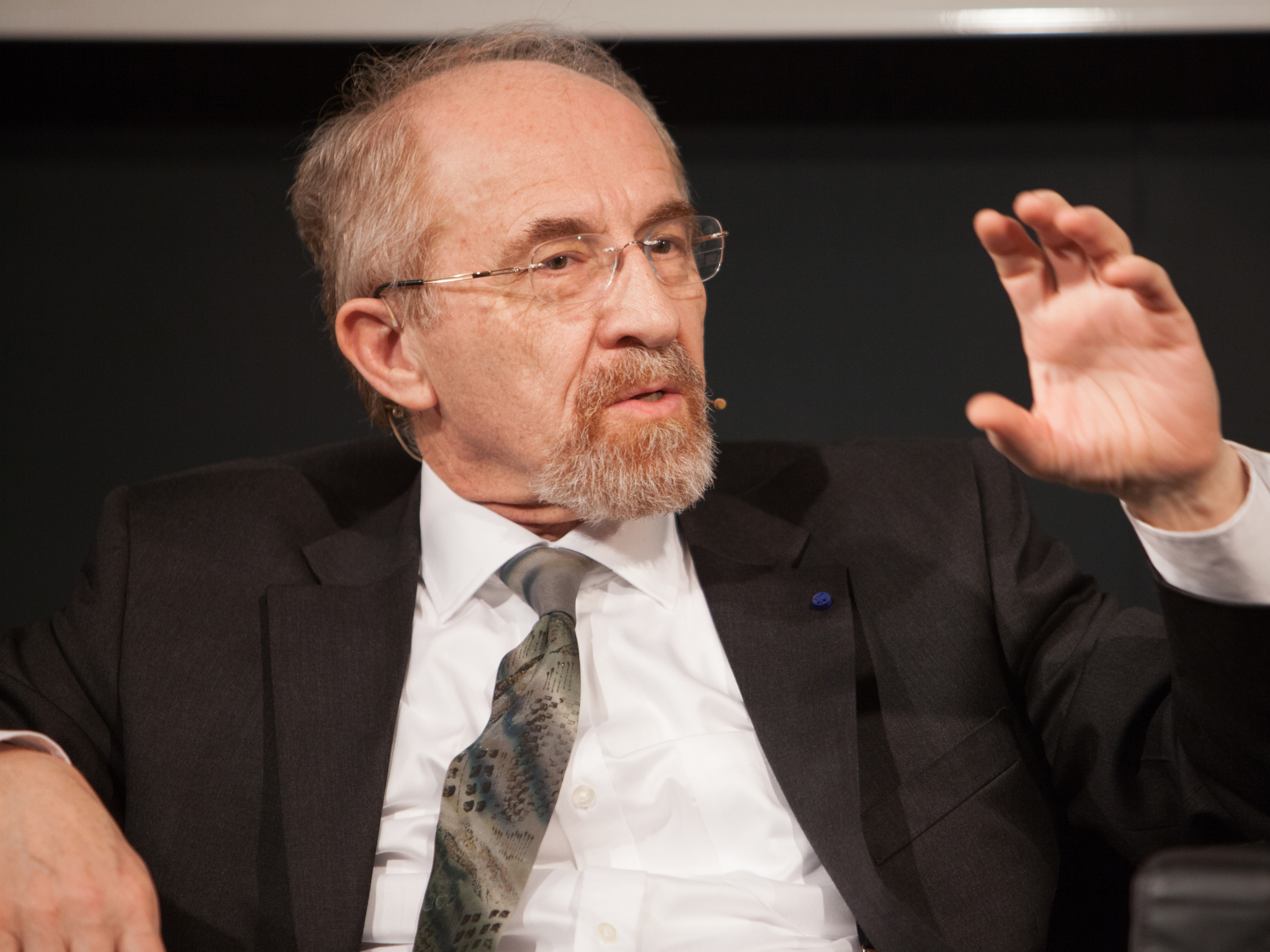
Henry Fuchs at "Visual Computing Trends" in Vienna, Austria, 2015

== Early life and education ==
Born in Tokaj, Hungary, Fuchs and his family immigrated to the United States in 1957. He received his bachelor's degree in Information and Computer Science from the University of California, Santa Cruz in 1970 and his Ph.D. in computer science from the University of Utah in 1975. His dissertation, supervised by Robert P. Plummer, was on the automatic sensing and analysis of 3D surface points.

== Career and research ==
Fuchs began his career as a programmer at UC Santa Cruz and later as an engineer at the Image Processing Laboratory of NASA's Jet Propulsion Laboratory. After completing his Ph.D., he became an assistant professor at the University of Texas at Dallas. In 1978, he joined the faculty at the University of North Carolina at Chapel Hill, where he was promoted to the Federico Gil Distinguished Professor of Computer Science in 1988, a position which he still holds.

His major research contributions have centered on developing high-performance graphics systems to solve complex, real-world problems.

=== Binary Space Partitioning (BSP) trees ===
In 1980, Fuchs co-developed the BSP tree, a novel data structure for rapidly rendering 3D scenes. This algorithm efficiently determined which objects were visible to the viewer and was highly influential in the development of 3D video games, including the landmark title Doom.

=== Pixel-Planes and PixelFlow ===
Beginning in the 1980s, Fuchs co-led a team that designed and built several powerful parallel-processing graphics engines. The Pixel-Planes and later PixelFlow systems pioneered architectures that distributed computation to the pixel level, dramatically accelerating rendering speeds. This work was foundational to the development of modern Graphics Processing Units (GPUs).

=== Medical virtual and augmented reality ===
Fuchs has been a leader in applying computer graphics to medicine. His UNC team developed systems for 3D medical imaging and guidance. A key project was an ultrasound-guided needle biopsy system that used augmented reality to superimpose live 3D ultrasound imagery onto the patient, allowing for more precise instrument navigation during procedures.

== Awards and honors ==
1992: ACM SIGGRAPH Computer Graphics Achievement Award

1992: National Computer Graphics Association Academic Award, NCGA

1995: ACM Fellow

1997: Elected a member of the National Academy of Engineering for contributions to computer graphics hardware and algorithms.

1997: Satava Award, Medicine Meets Virtual Reality Conference

1997: American Academy of Arts & Sciences

2013: IEEE-VGTC Virtual Reality Career Award

2015: Steven Anson Coons Award for Outstanding Creative Contributions to Computer Graphics

2015: IEEE Fellow

2018: The first class of ACM SIGGRAPH Academy

2018: ISMAR Career Impact Award

2018: ISMAR Best Paper Award

2018: Honorary Doctorate, TU Wien

2020: Eurographics Fellow
