= Computer Graphics (newsletter) =

Publication of ACM SIGGRAPH

Computer Graphics was a publication of ACM SIGGRAPH. It served as its newsletter, and has published the yearly SIGGRAPH Conference Proceedings up to 2003, as well as a variety of papers on a quarterly basis. The last edition was published in 2011.
