= Donald P. Greenberg =

American professor

Donald Peter Greenberg (born 1934) was the Jacob Gould Schurman Professor of Computer Graphics at Cornell University from 1966 to 2025.

== Early life ==
Greenberg earned his undergraduate and Ph.D. degrees from Cornell University, where he played on the tennis and soccer teams and was a member of Tau Delta Phi and the Quill and Dagger society.

== Career ==
In the late 1960s, Greenberg constructed the so-called "flying diaper" sculpture, which stands at the entrance of the Cornell Botanic Gardens.

Greenberg joined the Cornell faculty in 1968 with a joint appointment in the College of Engineering and Department of Architecture.

In 1971, Greenberg produced an early sophisticated computer graphics movie, Cornell in Perspective, using the General Electric Visual Simulation Laboratory with the assistance of its director, Quill and Dagger classmate Rodney S. Rougelot. Greenberg also co-authored a series of papers on the Cornell Box.

An internationally recognized pioneer in computer graphics, Greenberg has authored hundreds of articles and served as a teacher and mentor to many prominent computer graphic artists and animators. Five former students have won Academy Awards for Scientific or Technical Achievements, five have won the SIGGRAPH Achievement Award, and many now work for Pixar Animation Studios. Greenberg was the founding director of the National Science Foundation Science and Technology Center for Computer Graphics and Scientific Visualization when it was created in 1991. His former students include Robert L. Cook, Marc Levoy, and Wayne Lytle.

He has been the Director of the Program of Computer Graphics for thirty-two years and was the originator and former Director of the Computer Aided Design Instructional Facility at Cornell University.

Greenberg received the Steven Anson Coons Award in 1987, the most prestigious award in the field of computer graphics.

Prior to teaching at Cornell, Greenberg was a consulting engineer with Severud Associates, working on famous structures like the St. Louis Arch and Madison Square Garden.

Greenberg has served as a visiting professor at ETH Zurich and Yale University. He is on the board of directors of the Interactive Data Corporation and Chyron Corporation. He holds membership in the National Academy of Engineering, American Association for the Advancement of Science, Association for Computing Machinery, Institute of Electrical and Electronics Engineers, SIGGRAPH, and Eurographics. He was named a fellow of ACM in 1995.

He taught a Virtual reality course cross listed under 4 departments at Cornell- Architecture, Art, Computer Science and Engineering.
