= Robert L. Cook =

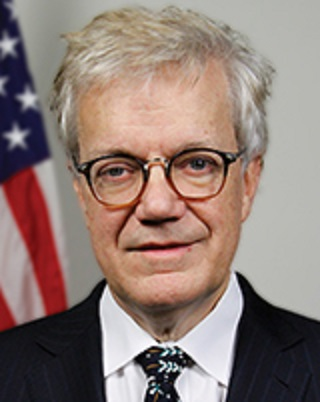
- Commissioner, Technology Transformation Services
- Born: December 10, 1952 (age 73)
- Scientific career
- Fields: Computer science

Robert L. Cook (December 10, 1952) is a computer graphics researcher and developer, and the co-creator of the RenderMan rendering software. His contributions are considered to be highly influential in the field of animated arts.

In 2009, Cook was elected a member of the National Academy of Engineering for building the motion picture industry's standard rendering tool.

Cook was born in Knoxville, Tennessee and educated at Duke University and Cornell University. While at Cornell, Cook worked with Donald P. Greenberg.

== Education ==
- B.S. in physics, 1973, Duke University, N.C.
- M.S. in computer graphics, 1981, Cornell University, Ithaca, N.Y.

== Career ==
Robert Cook at Stanford University in February 2010.

Robert Cook was involved with Lucasfilm and later had the position as Vice President of Software Development at Pixar Animation Studios, which he left in 1989. In November 2016, he became the Commissioner of the General Services Administration's Technology Transformation Services department.

== Computer Animation Rendering ==
- Star Trek II: The Wrath of Khan (1982) computer graphics: Industrial Light & Magic
- André and Wally B. (1984) 3D rendering
- Luxo, Jr. (1986) rendering
- Red's Dream (1987) reyes / miracle tilt
- Toy Story (1995) renderman software development
- Toy Story 2 (1999) rendering software engineer
- Monsters, Inc. (2001) software team lead
- Cars (2006) software team lead
- Up (2009) software development: Pixar studio team

== Awards ==
- 1987, ACM SIGGRAPH Achievement Award in recognition of his contributions to the fields of computer graphics and visual effects.
- 1992, Scientific and Engineering Award for the development of "RenderMan" software which produces images used in motion pictures from 3D computer descriptions of shape and appearance.
- 1999, Fellow of the Association for Computing Machinery.
- 2000, Academy Award of Merit (Oscar) for significant advancements to the field of motion picture rendering as exemplified in Pixar's RenderMan. Their broad professional influence in the industry continues to inspire and contribute to the advancement of computer-generated imagery for motion pictures.
- GATF InterTech Award
- MacWorld World Class Award
- Seybold Award for Excellence
- 2009, The Steven Anson Coons Award for Outstanding Creative Contributions to Computer Graphics
- 2009, Elected to the National Academy of Engineering
