= J. Turner Whitted =

Electrical engineer and computer scientist

John Turner Whitted is an electrical engineer and computer scientist who introduced recursive ray tracing to the computer graphics community with his 1979 paper "An improved illumination model for shaded display". His algorithm proved to be a practical method of simulating global illumination, inspired many variations, and is in wide use today. Simple recursive implementations of ray tracing are still occasionally referred to as Whitted-style ray tracing.

== Early life and education ==
Whitted was born in Durham, North Carolina, and grew up in Winston-Salem.

Whitted received his BSE and MS degrees in electrical engineering from Duke University, received his PhD from North Carolina State University in 1978, and joined Bell Labs.

== Career ==
In December 1983, Whitted co-founded computer graphics technology firm Numerical Design Limited (NDL) with Dr. Robert Whitton. Whitted would serve as president and technical director at NDL until 1996 and continue as a director of the company until NDL's merger with Emergent Game Technologies in 2005.

He later worked at Microsoft Research and in 2014 joined NVidia Research.

Whitted is currently an adjunct research professor at the University of North Carolina at Chapel Hill and adjunct professor at North Carolina State University.

He is a member of the National Academy of Engineering and was awarded the Steven Anson Coons Award for Outstanding Creative Contributions to Computer Graphics in 2013.
