= Jim Kajiya =

American computer scientist

James Kajiya
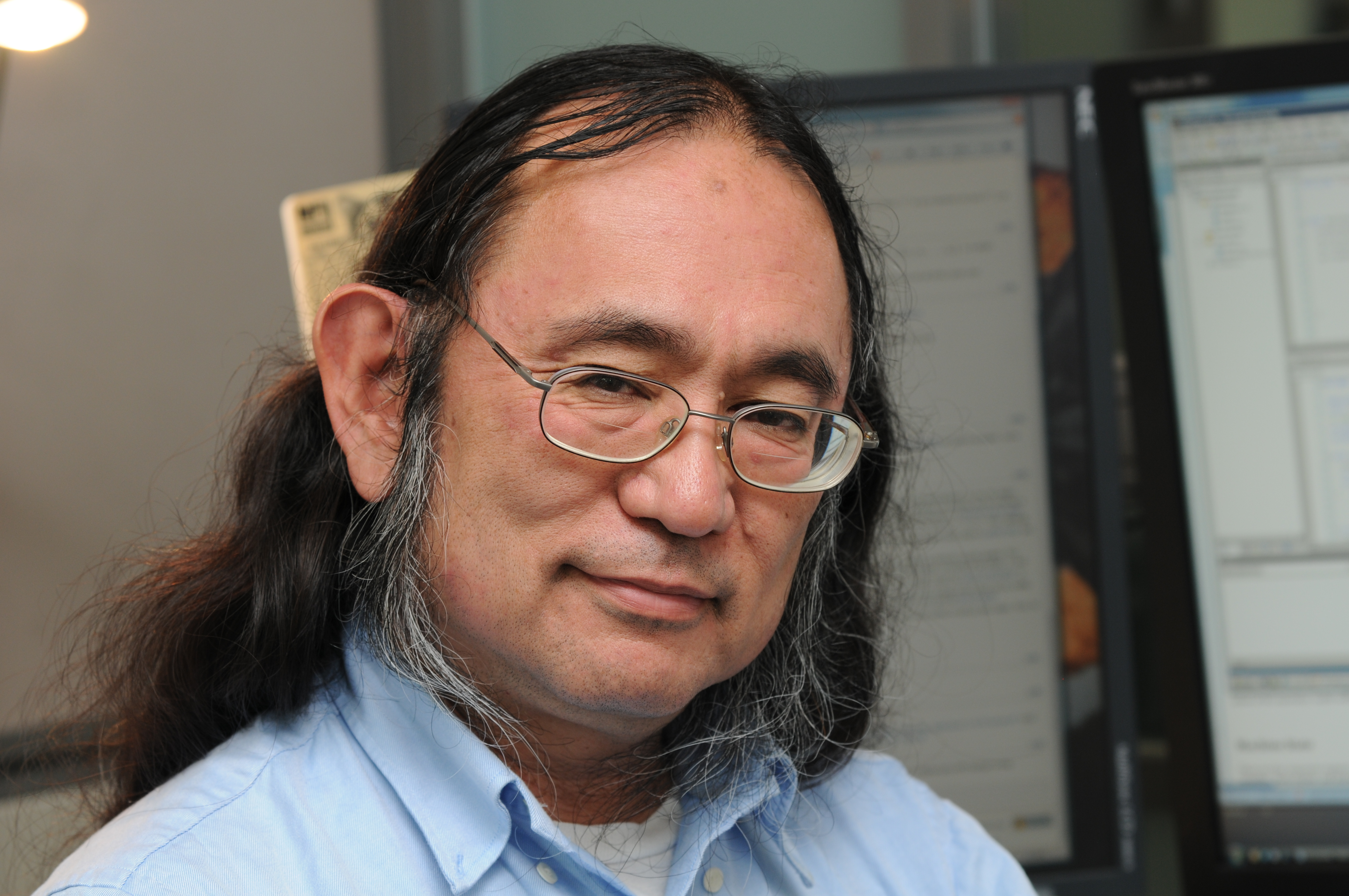
- Kajiya in his office at Microsoft Research in 2009
- Education: University of Utah
- Known for: Development of the rendering equation
- Scientific career
- Fields: Computer graphics
- Workplaces: Caltech

James Kajiya is a pioneer in the field of computer graphics. He is perhaps best known for the development of the rendering equation.

Kajiya received his PhD from the University of Utah in 1979, was a professor at Caltech from 1979 through 1994, and is currently a researcher at Microsoft Research.

In 2002, Kajiya was elected a member of the National Academy of Engineering for contributions to formal and practical methods of computer image generation.
