= SIGGRAPH =

Conference on computer graphics

SIGGRAPH Conference
- Status: Active
- Genre: Computer graphics conference
- Frequency: Annual
- Countries: United States, Canada
- Inaugurated: 1974; 52 years ago
- Most recent: 2026 (Los Angeles)
- Next event: 2027 (Anaheim)
- Organizer: ACM SIGGRAPH
- Website: siggraph.org

SIGGRAPH Asia Conference
- Status: Active
- Genre: Computer graphics conference
- Frequency: Annual
- Countries: Australia, China, Hong Kong, Macau, Japan, Singapore, South Korea, Thailand, Malaysia
- Inaugurated: 2008; 18 years ago
- Most recent: 2025 (Hong Kong)
- Next event: 2026 (Kuala Lumpur)
- Organizer: ACM SIGGRAPH
- Website: asia.siggraph.org

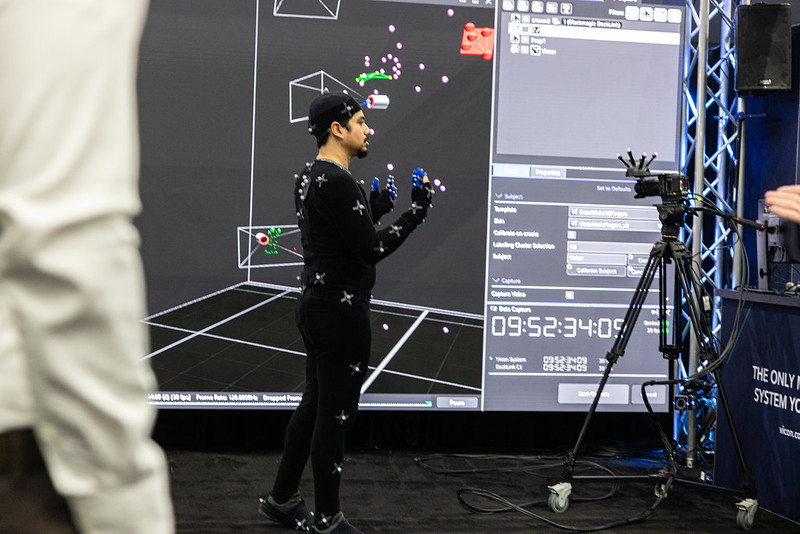
An exhibitor at SIGGRAPH 2023 demoing a full-body motion capture suit

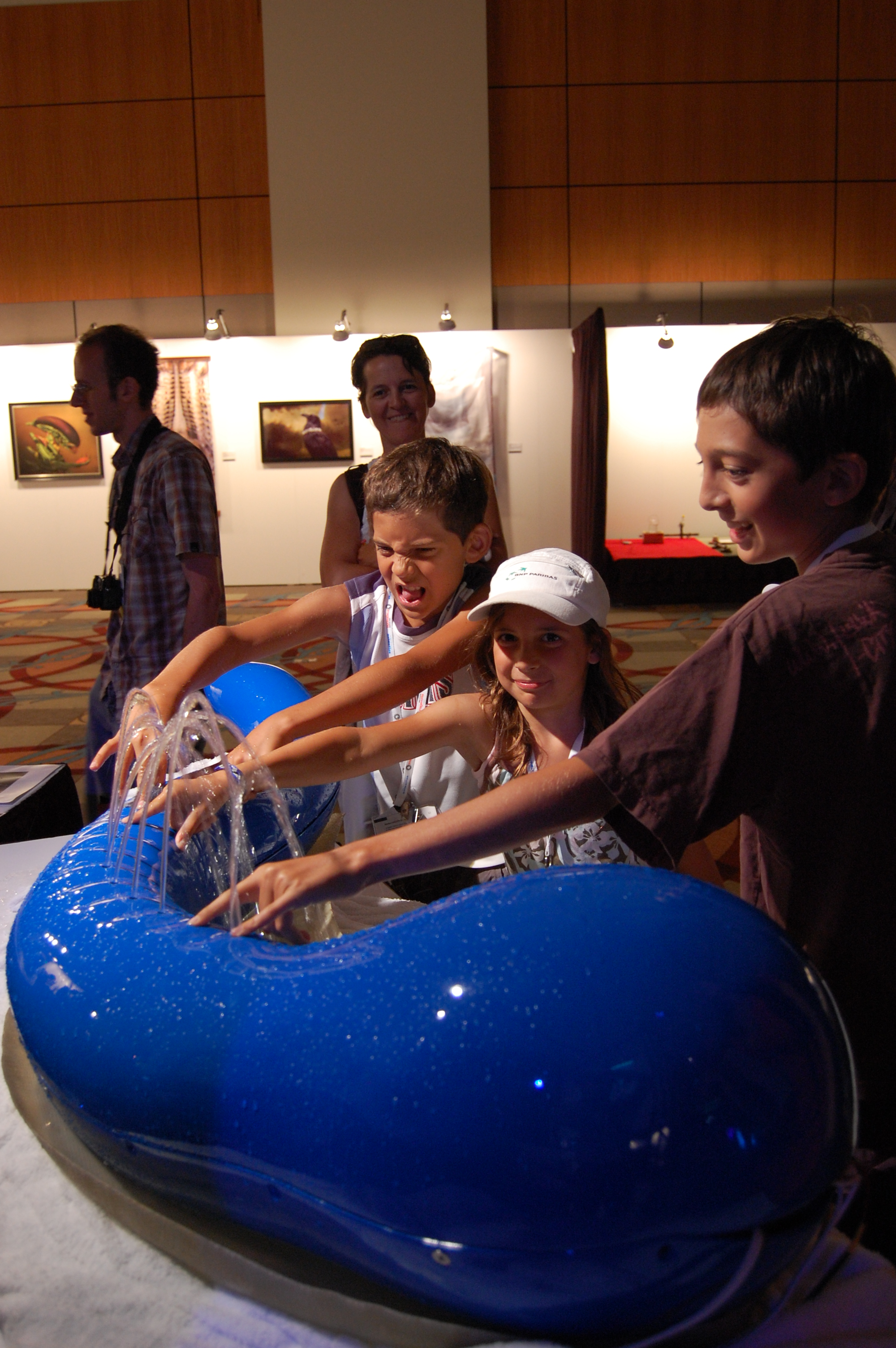
Hydraulophone, presented at SIGGRAPH 2007

This narrated animation shown as a Daily at SIGGRAPH 2015 describes a method of automatically mapping of 87 gigapixels of data over Greenland.

SIGGRAPH is an annual conference centered around computer graphics organized by the ACM. It was first held in 1974 in Boulder, Colorado. The main conference has always been held in North America; SIGGRAPH Asia, a second conference held annually, has been held since 2008 in countries throughout Asia, as well as twice in Australia.

== Overview ==
The conference incorporates both academic presentations as well as an industry trade show. Other events at the conference include educational courses and panel discussions on recent topics in computer graphics and interactive techniques.

=== SIGGRAPH Proceedings ===
The SIGGRAPH conference proceedings, which are published in the ACM Transactions on Graphics, has one of the highest impact factors among academic publications in the field of computer graphics. The paper acceptance rate for SIGGRAPH has historically been between 17% and 29%, with the average acceptance rate between 2015 and 2019 of 27%. The submitted papers are peer-reviewed under a process that was historically single-blind, but was changed in 2018 to double-blind. The papers accepted for presentation at SIGGRAPH are printed since 2003 in a special issue of the ACM Transactions on Graphics journal. Prior to 1992, SIGGRAPH papers were printed as part of the Computer Graphics publication; between 1993 and 2001, there was a dedicated SIGGRAPH Conference Proceedings series of publications.

=== Awards programs ===
SIGGRAPH has several awards programs to recognize contributions to computer graphics. The most prestigious is the Steven Anson Coons Award for Outstanding Creative Contributions to Computer Graphics. It has been awarded every two years since 1983 to recognize an individual's lifetime achievement in computer graphics.

== Conference ==
The SIGGRAPH conference experienced significant growth starting in the 1970s, peaking around the turn of the century. A second conference, SIGGRAPH Asia, started in 2008.

=== SIGGRAPH ===
Year	Location	Attendees	Exhibitors	Website
2028	Vancouver			
2027	Anaheim			
2026	Los Angeles	9,500+		
2025	Vancouver & Virtual	12,400+		
2024	Denver & Virtual	9,000-		
2023	Los Angeles & Virtual	14,275+		
2022	Vancouver & Virtual	11,700+	90+	
2021	Los Angeles & Virtual	—N/a		
2020	Virtual	10,000+		
2019	Los Angeles	18,700	180	
2018	Vancouver	16,637	160	
2017	Los Angeles	16,500	150	
2016	Anaheim	14,000	153	
2015	Los Angeles	14,800	143	
2014	Vancouver	14,045	175	
2013	Anaheim	17,162	180	
2012	Los Angeles	21,212	161	
2011	Vancouver	15,872	156	
2010	Los Angeles	22,549	160	
2009	New Orleans	11,000	140	
2008	Los Angeles	28,432	230	
2007	San Diego	24,043	230	
2006	Boston	19,764	230	
2005	Los Angeles	29,122	250	
2004	Los Angeles	27,825	229	
2003	San Diego	24,332	240	
2002	San Antonio	17,274	225	
2001	Los Angeles	34,024	303	
2000	New Orleans	25,986	316	
1999	Los Angeles	42,690	337	
1998	Orlando	32,210	327	
1997	Los Angeles	48,700		
1996	New Orleans	28,500	321	
1995	Los Angeles	40,100	297	
1994	Orlando	25,000	269	
1993	Anaheim	27,000	285	
1992	Chicago	34,148	253	
1991	Las Vegas	23,100	282	
1990	Dallas	24,684	248	
1989	Boston	27,000	238	
1988	Atlanta	19,000	249	
1987	Anaheim	30,541	274	
1986	Dallas	22,000	253	
1985	San Francisco	27,000	254	
1984	Minneapolis	20,390	218	
1983	Detroit	14,000	195	
1982	Boston	17,000	172	
1981	Dallas	14,000	124	
1980	Seattle	7,500	80	
1979	Chicago	3,000	79	
1978	Atlanta	1,500	44	
1977	San Jose	750	38	
1976	Philadelphia	300	10	
1975	Bowling Green, Ohio	300		
1974	Boulder	600		

=== SIGGRAPH Asia ===
Year	Location	Attendees	Exhibitors	Website
2028	TBA			
2027	Tokyo, Japan			
2026	Kuala Lumpur, Malaysia			
2025	Hong Kong	6000+	70+	
2024	Tokyo, Japan	8415		
2023	Sydney, NSW, Australia	5690		
2022	Daegu, South Korea	3000+		
2021	Tokyo, Japan			
2020	Virtual			
2019	Brisbane, QLD, Australia	5120+		
2018	Tokyo, Japan	9735		
2017	Bangkok, Thailand	8000+		
2016	Macao	6000+		
2015	Kobe, Japan	7000+		
2014	Shenzhen, China	6000-7000		
2013	Hong Kong			
2012	Singapore			
2011	Hong Kong	7,500	122	
2010	Seoul, Republic of Korea	9,238		
2009	Yokohama, Japan	6,400		
2008	Suntec City, Singapore	3,200	80-	

=== Sponsored Conference ===
SIGGRAPH sponsored a number of conferences related to the field of computer graphics, including the ACM SIGGRAPH/Eurographics Symposium on Computer Animation, the ACM SIGGRAPH Conference on Motion, Interaction and Games (formerly known as Motion in Games).

== See also ==
- Association for Computing Machinery
- ACM SIGGRAPH
- ACM Transactions on Graphics
- Computer Graphics, a publication of ACM SIGGRAPH
- The list of computer science conferences contains other academic conferences in computer science.
- Nvidia GTC
