= ACM Transactions on Graphics =

- Discipline: computer graphics
- Language: English
- Edited by: Eitan Grinspun

Publication details
- History: 1982–present
- Publisher: ACM
- Frequency: Bimonthly
- Impact factor: 13.0 (2025)

Standard abbreviations
- ISO 4: ACM Trans. Graph.

Indexing
- ISSN: 0730-0301 (print); 1557-7368 (web)
- OCLC no.: 7941481

Links
- Journal homepage; Online access; Online archive

ACM Transactions on Graphics (TOG) is a bimonthly peer-reviewed scientific journal that covers the field of computer graphics. The editor-in-chief is Eitan Grinspun (University of Toronto), who began a three-year term on January 1, 2026, succeeding Carol O'Sullivan (Trinity College Dublin). According to the Journal Citation Reports, the journal had a 2025 impact factor of 13.0, released June 17, 2026 and based on 2025 citation data. The journal ranks 1st in computer graphics publications, according to Google Scholar Metrics.

== History ==
It was established in 1982 and is published by the Association for Computing Machinery. TOG publishes two special issues for ACM SIGGRAPH's conference proceedings. Starting in 2003, all papers accepted for presentation at the annual SIGGRAPH conference are printed in a special summer issue of the journal. Beginning in 2008, papers presented at SIGGRAPH Asia are printed in a special November/December issue.
