= Sutherland's Volkswagen =

3D test model

3D Model of Sutherland's Volkswagen

Sutherland's Volkswagen, or the Utah VW Bug, is a 3D model. It is a mathematical model of a 1967 Volkswagen Beetle and one of the earliest 3D computer models, aside from Catmull's hand.

The Volkswagen model was created by students of Professor Ivan Sutherland in 1972 at the University of Utah. The students created the model by measuring a real version of the car with yardsticks. Only the car body is modeled, not the wheels or chassis. The model became slightly iconic after all the various parts, as measured by students, were pieced together, with the necessary rotations, scaling, and translations.

== See also ==
- 3D modeling
- Utah teapot
- Amiga Boing Ball
- Stanford bunny
- Stanford dragon
- Suzanne
- Cornell box
- List of common 3D test models
