= List of common 3D test models =

This is a list of models and meshes commonly used in 3D computer graphics for testing and demonstrating rendering algorithms and visual effects. Their use is important for comparing results, similar to the way standard test images are used in image processing.

== Modeled ==
Designed using CAD software; sorted by year of modeling.

Name and viewer	Render	Year of creation	Person/organisation that did the modeling	Description of source object	Model size	License	Comments
Utah teapot		1975	Martin Newell at University of Utah	Melitta teapot	28 Bézier patches (32 with the bottom)	Commercial use allowed	Also called the "Newell teapot". One of the first models not to be measured.
Cornell box		1984	Cindy M. Goral, Kenneth E. Torrance, Donald P. Greenberg, Bennett Battaile at Cornell University	A 2 foot square box, open on one side, two opposing interior sides each painted a contrasting color, with the rest of the box painted light gray	5 quads 1 light source		Use as a 3D test model commonly relies on familiarity with the expected results rather than rerunning the experiment against a real-life setup.
Suzanne		2002	Willem-Paul van Overbruggen for Blender	Chimpanzee head, based on an orangutan from the movie Jay and Silent Bob Strike Back	500 faces	GNU GPL 2+ (inherited from Blender as a whole)	Mascot for Blender
Crytek Sponza		2010	Frank Meinl at Crytek	The colonnaded atrium of the Sponza Palace in Dubrovnik	184,330 vertices 262,267 triangles		Used for demonstrating global illumination techniques. The Crytek version is based on a model created by Marko Dabrović in early 2001 while he was at RNA studio, and donated to a radiosity competition held by CGTechniques.com in early 2002.
Spot		2012	Keenan Crane at Caltech	Cartoon cow	2,930 vertices 5,856 triangles	CC0	Catmull-Clark control mesh, quadrangulation, triangulation, vector texture, and bitmap texture. All meshes are manifold, genus-0 embeddings.
3DBenchy		2015	Creative Tools	Cartoon toy boat	112,569 vertices 225,154 triangles	CC0	Specifically designed for testing the accuracy and capabilities of 3D printers

== Scanned ==
Includes photogrammetric methods; sorted by year of scanning.

Name and viewer	Render	Year of creation	Person/organisation responsible for the scan	Description of source object	Model size	License	Comments
Stanford bunny		1993-94	Greg Turk, Marc Levoy at Stanford University	Ceramic rabbit	69,451 triangles	Figurine of unknown authorship and licensing status, scan itself released under a two-clause BSD license.	A test of range scanning physical objects. Originally .ply file.
Stanford dragon		1996	Stanford University	Chinese dragon	1,132,830 triangles		
Stanford Armadillo	3D model of an armadillo action figure	1996	Venkat Krishnamurthy and Marc Levoy at Stanford University	Armadillo action figure	345,944 triangles	Free for scholarly writings and research, attribution required, no commercial use without prior permission	
Wooden Elk Toy		2000	Hans-Peter Seidel at Max-Planck-Institut für Informatik				Often used as an example of a non-trivial object with high genus.
Phlegmatic Dragon	Phlegmatic Dragon	2007	Academy of Sciences of the Czech Republic, Czech Technical University in PragueEurographics 2007 conference		667,214 faces (original); 480,076 faces (smoothed)	Sticker on the bottom says "GRUNCH © PANTON '88 MADE IN ENGLAND"	Smoothed and nonsmoothed
David		2009	Stanford University	Michelangelo's 5-meter statue David	~1 billion polygons	Only available to established scholars and for non-commercial use only.	range data
Fertility		2009	AIM@SHAPE Repository (scanned at Utrecht University)	Small stone statue with two joined figures.	241,607 vertices 483,226 triangles		Laser scan.
Nefertiti		2015	Nora Al-Badri and Jan Nikolai Nelles	A stoneworked bust of the Egyptian queen Nefertiti created in 1345 BC by Thutmose	~2 million triangles	CC By SA 4.0	Surreptitiously scanned by Nora Al-Badri and Jan Nikolai Nelles, and subsequently separately by Scan the World with permission of the Neues Museum.

== Gallery ==
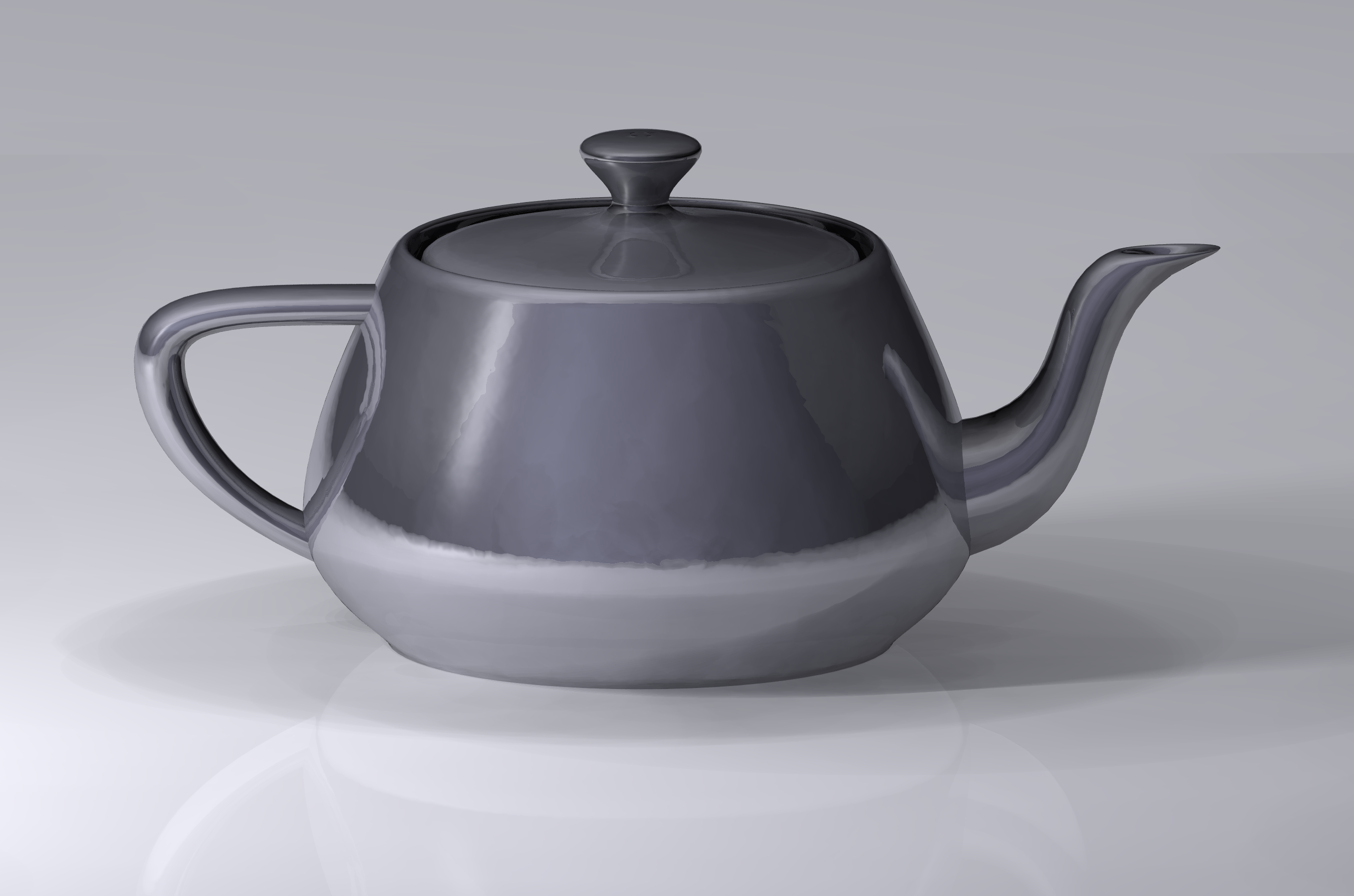
The Utah teapot (1975) has a "hole" in it so it has a genus greater than zero.

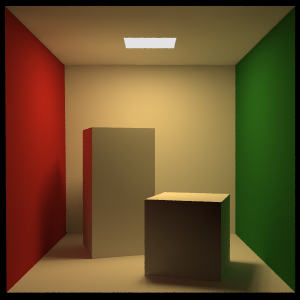
The Cornell box (1985) tests lighting and rendering.

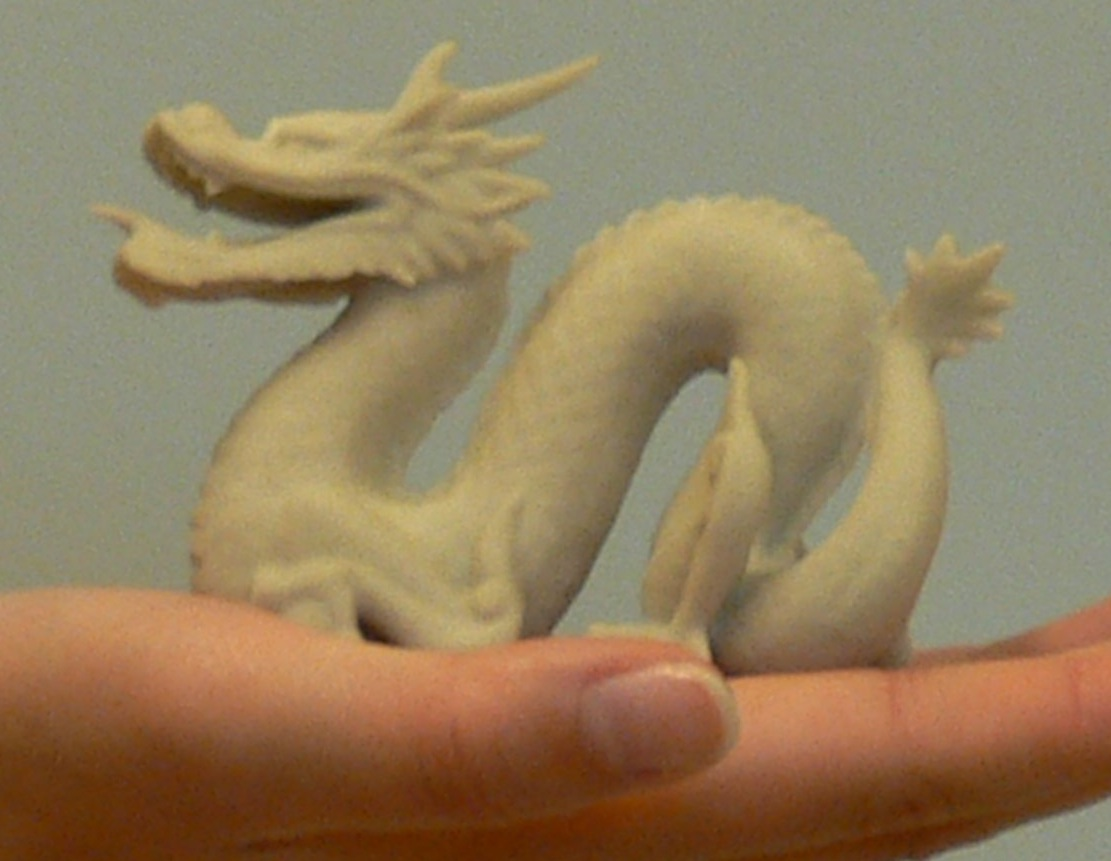
A 3D-printed reproduction of Stanford dragon (1996) physical model, made through rapid prototyping

Suzanne (2002) with wireframe

Spot (2012) shown homeomorphic to a sphere

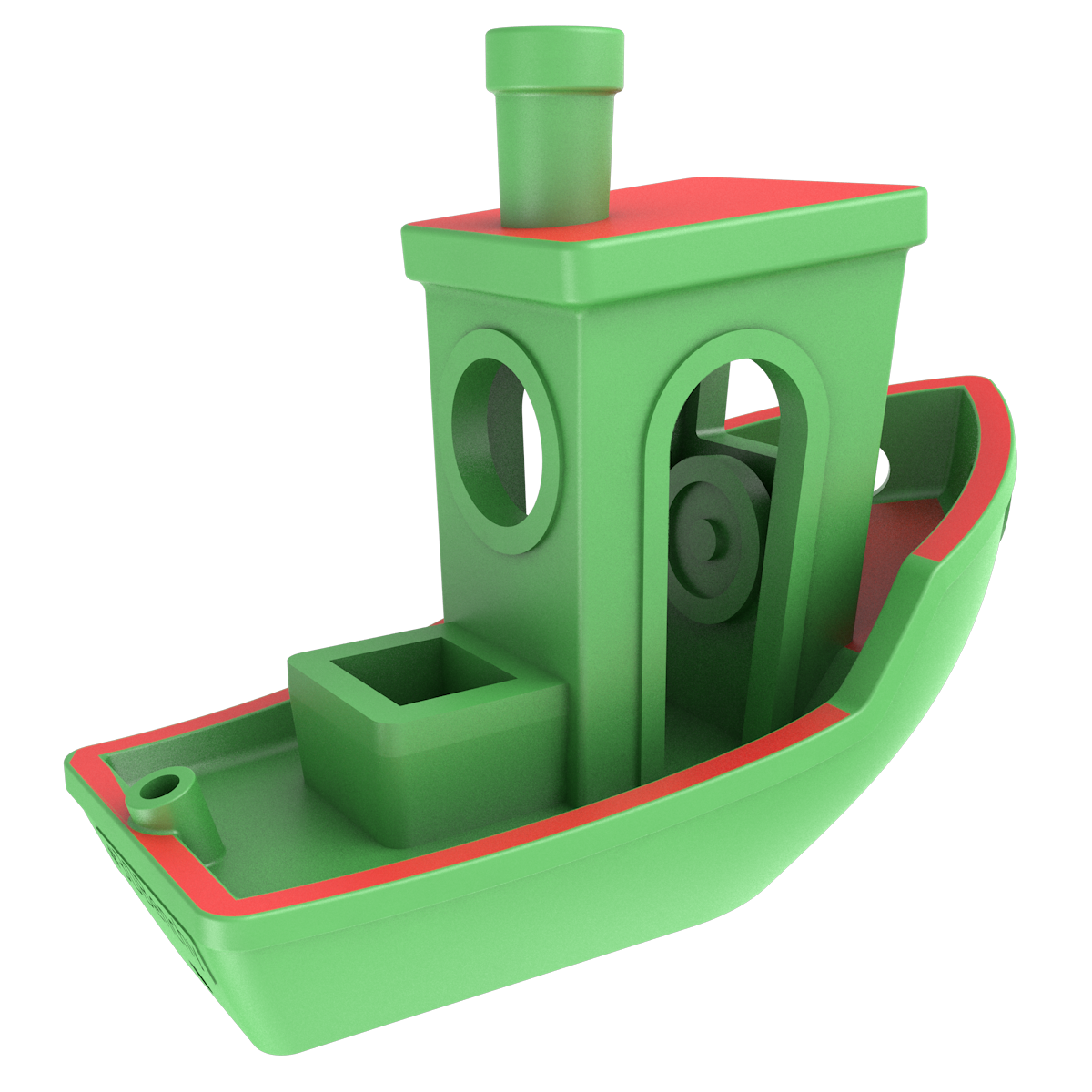
3DBenchy (2015), designed to test 3D printing

== See also ==
- Standard test image – Digital image used to test image algorithms
- A Computer Animated Hand
- Sutherland's Volkswagen – 3D test model
