= Hemicube =

Hemicube can mean:

- Hemicube (computer graphics), a concept in 3D computer graphics rendering
- Hemicube (geometry), an abstract regular polytope
- Demihypercube, an n-dimensional uniform polytope, also known as the n-hemicube
