= Melitta Bentz =

German entrepreneur and inventor of the coffee filter

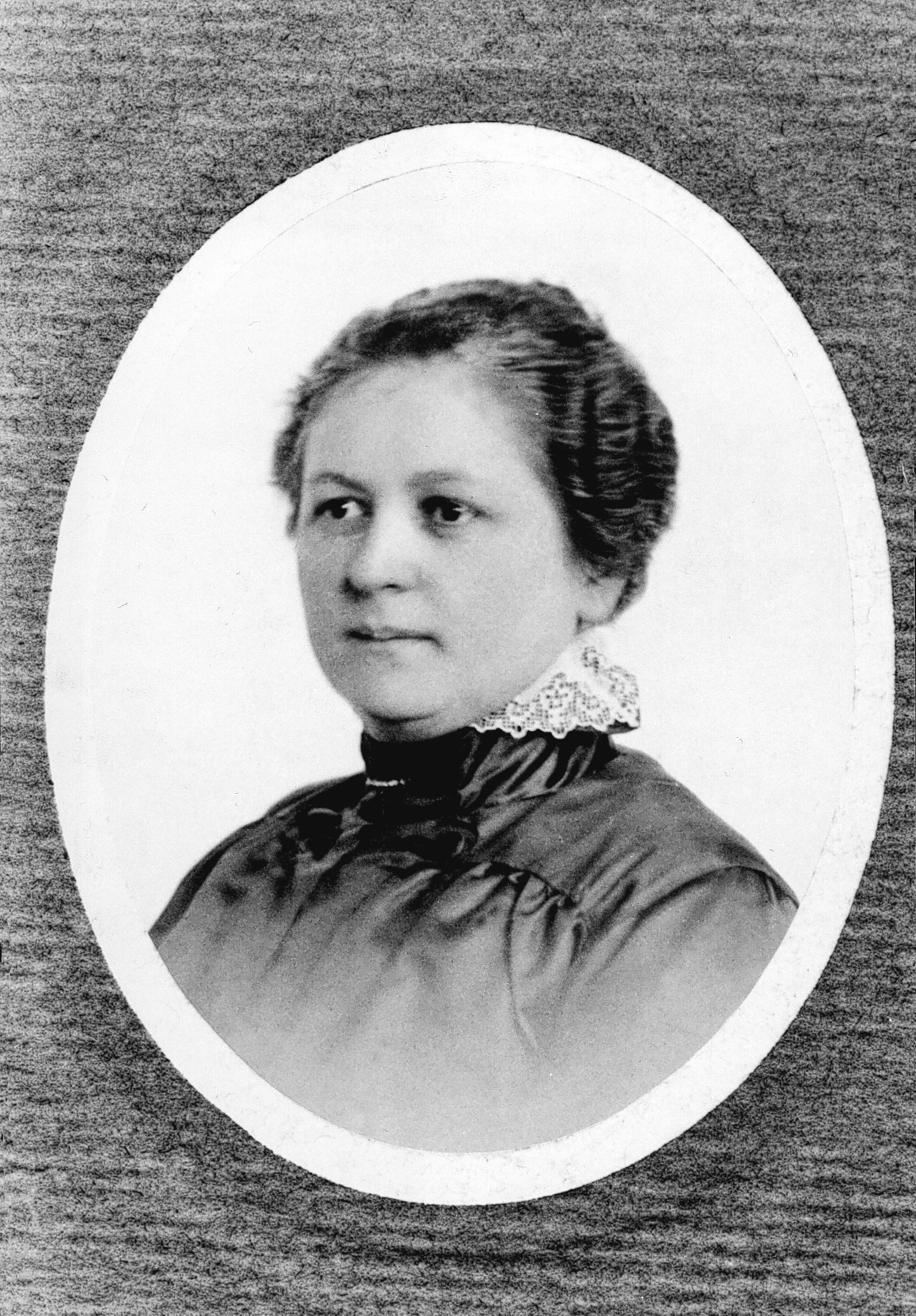
- Born: Amalie Auguste Melitta Liebscher; 31 January 1873; Dresden, Germany
- Died: 29 June 1950 (aged 77); Porta Westfalica, West Germany
- Occupation: Entrepreneur
- Spouse: Hugo Bentz
- Children: 3

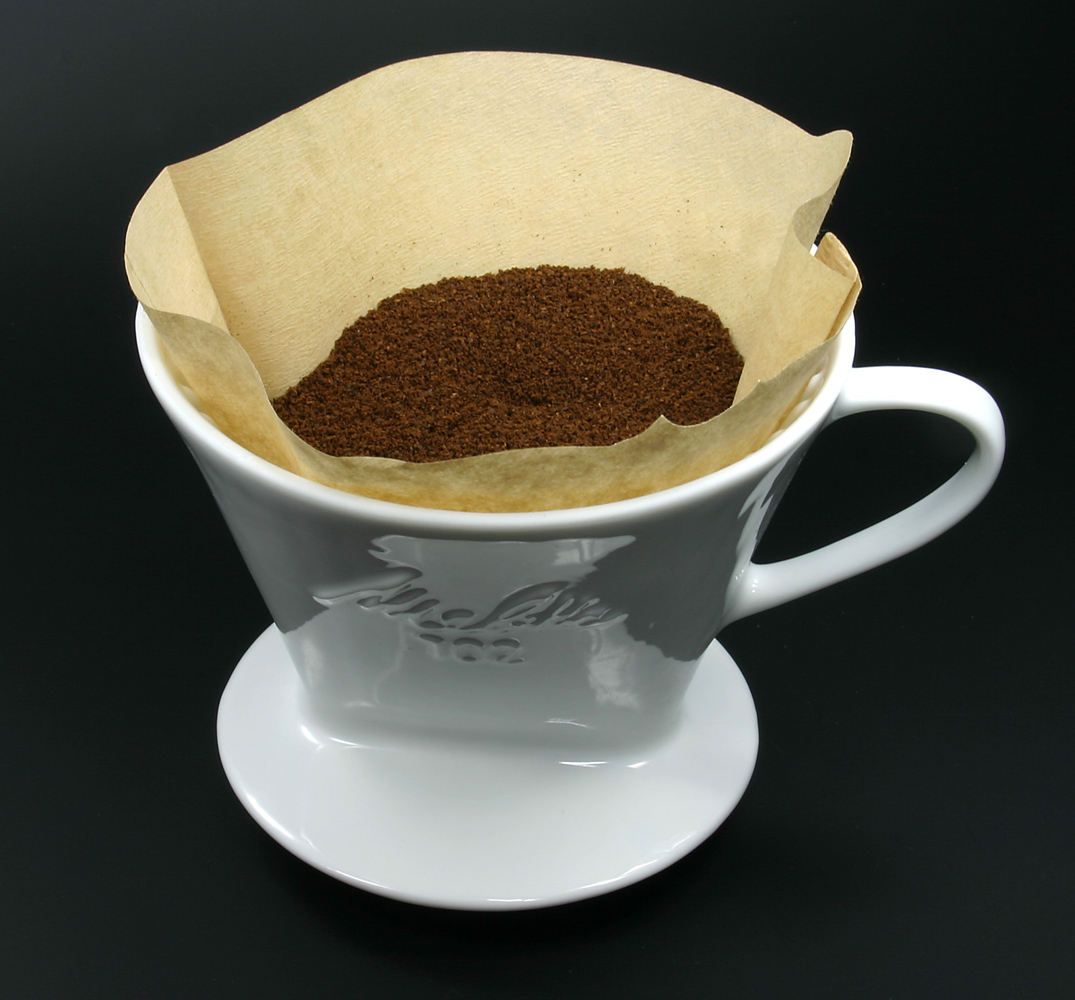
A Melitta coffee filter

Amalie Auguste Melitta Bentz (née Liebscher, January 31, 1873 – June 29, 1950) was a German inventor and entrepreneur known for revolutionizing the process of coffee brewing with her invention of the coffee filter. Her company, Melitta, has long been a significant leader in the coffee industry. Her contributions enhanced coffee preparation methods and influenced coffee culture around the world.

== Early life ==
Melitta Bentz (born Amalie Auguste Melitta Liebscher) was born in Dresden, Germany, on January 31, 1873. Her parents were Karl and Brigitte Liebscher, who were known as successful business owners. Her family was also largely composed of craftsmen, as her father was a publisher and her grandparents owned a brewery. She married Emil Hugo Bentz around 1898 or 1899. Hugo was also a small business owner, which proved quite valuable when Melitta began her own business. She had two sons named Willy (born 1899) and Horst (born 1904), respectively, and a daughter named Horta (born 1911).

== Invention of the coffee filter ==
At the beginning of the 20th century, Bentz realized that the process for brewing coffee was difficult and frustrating. From her experience as a housewife, she converged upon three major pain points with coffee makers. First, at this time, coffee was usually prepared with percolators. This led to a phenomenon known as overextraction, where too many compounds are extracted from the coffee grounds. Percolators work by cycling boiling water through coffee grounds. However, this constant overexposure to high temperatures, combined with already brewed coffee cycling through due to poor filtration, led the percolator to be particularly susceptible to overextraction. Secondly, already existing espresso filters left grounds in the drink. Not to mention it took up to five minutes to produce a cup of espresso. Bentz then turned to linen bags or cloth filters, but they were difficult to use and impossible to clean. Therefore, Bentz’s solution aimed at creating better-tasting coffee while making the process easier. After some trial and error, she stumbled upon a new solution. She ripped a piece of blotting paper from her son’s notebook and placed it in a perforated brass pot. Next, she added ground coffee and poured water over it, dripping through the holes in the pot into a cup. Bentz had just created the coffee filter. This solution addressed the pain points in a number of ways. The clean-up process was easier and more hygienic as the paper filter went straight into the trash, reducing the presence of messy coffee grounds. In Jun 1908, Bentz was granted a patent for her paper filter by The Imperial Patent Office in Berlin.

== Founding of the Melitta company ==
Bentz established the Melitta company with her husband Hugo in 1908. At first, the couple produced coffee filters at home; Hugo handled production and Melitta led marketing efforts. After World War I, the company expanded rapidly. In 1932, the company introduced cone-shaped filters, thus enhancing and refining the brewing process step-by-step.

== Struggles during World War I ==
As World War I broke out across Europe, Bentz's business encountered several problems. For starters, Bentz’s husband and her elder son, Willy, were drafted into the German Army. Bentz's brother, Paul Liebscher, helped to keep the company afloat during the war. Getting supplies became difficult; metals were being used for Zeppelin construction and paper was rationed. Furthermore, the British blockade of Germany made it extremely difficult for coffee beans to be imported, and demand began to fall.

== Post-war period and expansion of company ==
After World War I, the business resumed normal operations, thriving even through widespread poverty and rampant inflation in Germany. In 1923, Bentz's eldest son Willy became the co-owner and increased sales significantly. During the early 1920s, several imitators of Melitta’s coffee filter design appeared. In 1925, to combat these imitators, the company created the distinctive red and green packaging that it still uses today.

In 1929, the company moved from its Dresden factory into Minden, where the plant is still in use to this day. In the 1930s, the company patented the paper filters that are also still used. In 1932, to protect the business further from imitators, the first Melitta lettering was introduced. This was changed slightly in 1937 and has remained the same since. Melitta Bentz and her husband stepped down from daily operations in 1932 and passed control over to their children. She still played a role in providing better working conditions for the staff. She established a five-day work week, three weeks of vacation time, and a Christmas bonus. She also founded Melitta Aid in 1938 as a social fund for employees.

During World War II, Melitta Company paused production of coffee filters to instead produce military supplies for the Nazis as a "National Socialist model plant."

== Death and recognition ==
Melitta Bentz died in Porta Westfalica, Germany on June 29, 1950.

== See also ==
- German inventors and discoverers
