= Melitta =

German coffee company

Melitta Group
- Type: Private
- Industry: Retail Coffee
- Founded: 1908; 118 years ago
- Headquarters: Minden, North Rhine-Westphalia, Germany
- Products: Coffees, coffee filters, small appliance (coffee makers etc.)
- Revenue: 1.325 billion € (2014)
- Number of employees: 3,736 (2014)
- Website: www.melitta-group.com

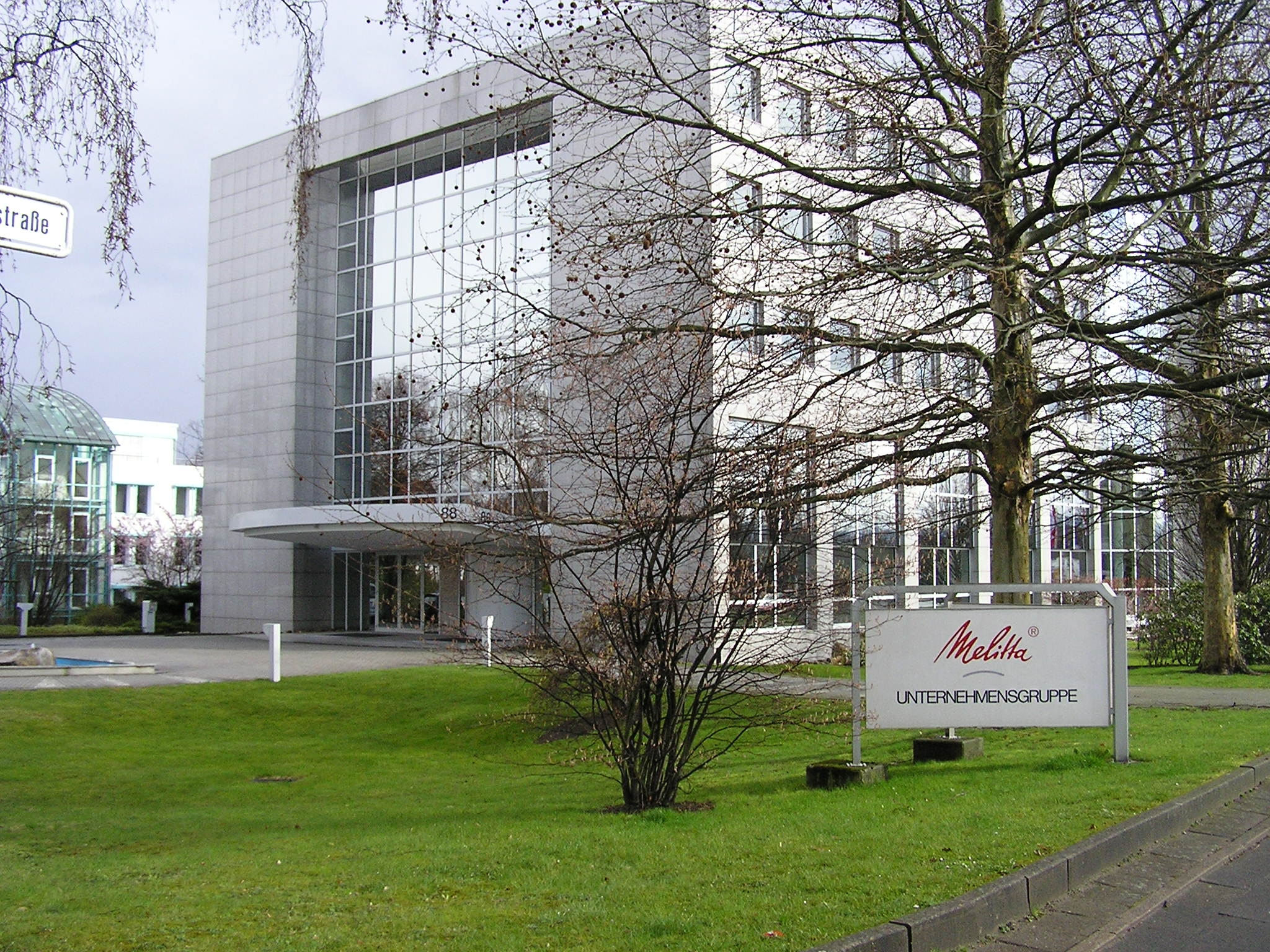
Melitta headquarters in Minden

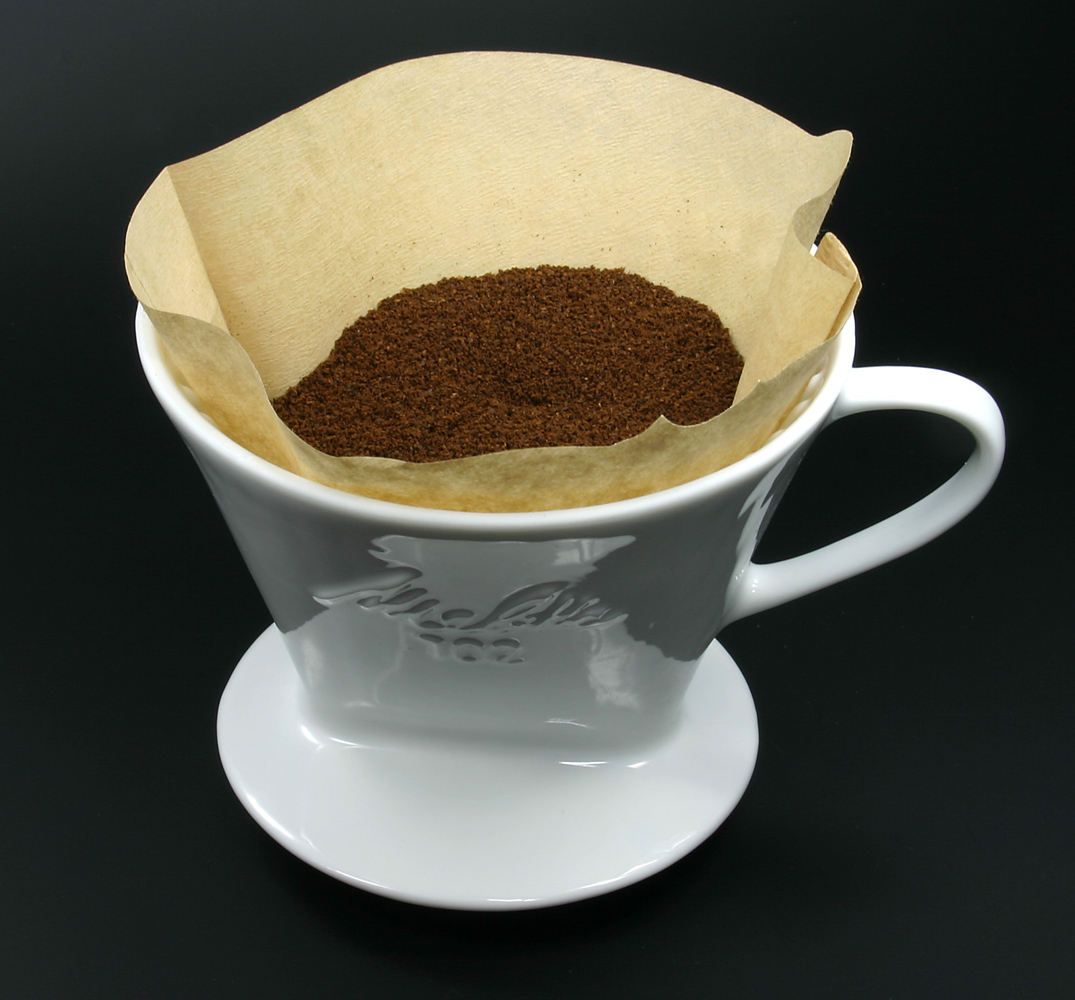
A Melitta coffee filter, containing ground coffee, in a single cup brewing holder

Melitta (/məˈliːtə/) is a German company selling coffee, paper coffee filters, and coffee makers, part of the Melitta Group, which has branches in other countries. The company is headquartered in Minden, North Rhine-Westphalia.

It is named after Melitta Bentz (1873–1950) who founded the company after she invented the drip brew paper coffee filter (German patent granted 8 July 1908). Bentz later ran the company as a family business.

== History ==
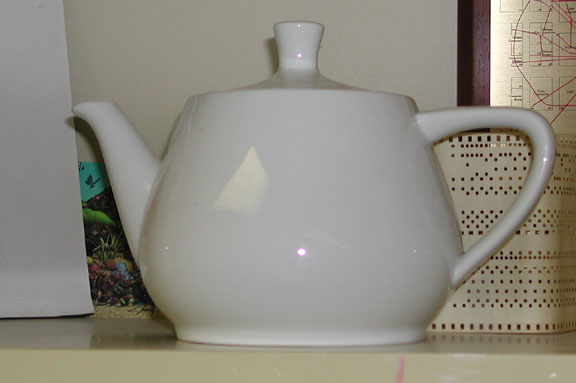
This Melitta teapot was the model for the Utah teapot 3D rendering, a ubiquitous object in early computer graphics research.

In 1908, Melitta Bentz, a 35-year-old woman from Dresden, Germany, invented the first coffee filter, receiving a patent registration for her "Filter Top Device lined with Filter Paper" from the Patent Office in Berlin on 8 July. She founded the company bearing her name the same year.

In the 1930s, Melitta revised the original filter, tapering it into the shape of a cone and adding ribs. This created a larger filtration area, allowing for improved extraction of the ground coffee. In 1936, the widely recognized cone-shaped filter paper that fit inside the tapered filter top was introduced. The '102' became the most popular.

During World War II, Melitta paused production of coffee filters to work with the Nazis to produce military supplies as part of a "National Socialist model plant."

Between 1941 and 1945, the Concordia Porzellanfabrik was used by Melitta. In 1951/1952 and 1957/1958, the Porta-Keramikwerke J. Brauers in Barkhausen at Porta Westfalica, Germany produced ceramic filters for Melitta. Langenthal Porzellan once also produced porcelain filters for Melitta. The Porzellanfabrik Friesland, founded in 1953 as part of the German Melitta group, and independent since 1991/1995, produced Melitta porcelain filters up to 2018. Since then, they continue to sell these filters under their own Friesland label, whereas Melitta itself switched to producing these filters in China.

Melitta continued to develop new techniques to improve the shape, performance, material and production process of its filter systems. In 1989, Natural Brown coffee filters made from unbleached pulp were introduced, which kept unwanted by-products from leaching into the environment. In 1992 Melitta developed an oxygen-bleaching process to produce white paper without chlorine.

In 1996, the Miele Group established the Dongguan factory as a joint venture with Melitta, which became fully owned by Miele in 2009.

In 1997, Melitta developed a filter with Flavor Pores, microfine perforations that filter out unwanted sediment, particles and oils. In 2002 Melitta added a second safety crimp to increase strength and durability. In 2007 bamboo Filters were introduced and the Flavor Pores filter was improved.

As of 2015 Melitta Group KG employed 3,300 people.

In the 2019 financial year, the group's turnover increased by 10 percent to almost 1.7 billion euros. The number of employees grew to 5654.

In April 2020, Melitta announced that the company would be manufacturing nose and face masks as part of the COVID-19 pandemic. The masks consist of a three-layer fleece and are produced worldwide. Melitta donates the first million masks to healthcare facilities.

== Melitta USA ==
Melitta USA, headquartered in Clearwater, Florida, is part of the privately held Melitta Group of Minden, Germany. Melitta USA is responsible for the sales and marketing of Melitta coffee filters, coffee, and non electric coffee systems in the USA.

Melitta USA's coffee filters are manufactured in Clearwater, Florida, and the company has a coffee roasting operation in Cherry Hill, New Jersey. The company Web site said in 2018 that it had been roasting coffee in Cherry Hill for more than 50 years.

== See also ==
- Easy Serving Espresso Pod
- Flavia Beverage Systems
- Tea culture § Germany
- Utah teapot, a 3D graphics computer model of a modern Melitta teapot used in graphics research and testing
