= Utah teapot =

Computer graphics 3D reference and test model

A 3D STL model of the teapot

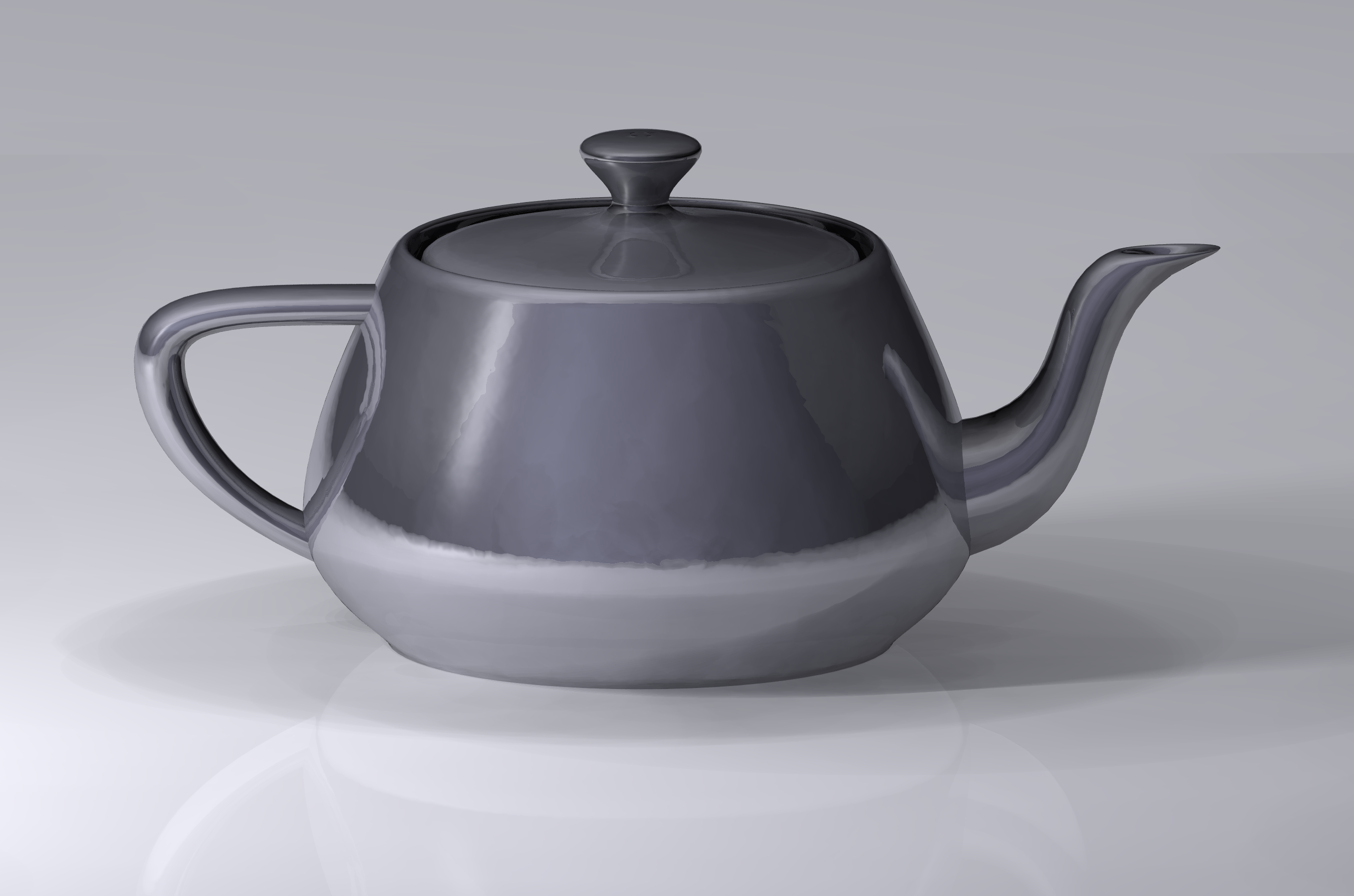
A 2008 rendering of the Utah teapot model

The Utah teapot, or the Newell teapot, is one of the standard reference test models in 3D modeling and an in-joke within the computer graphics community. It is a mathematical model of an ordinary Melitta-brand teapot designed by Lieselotte Kantner that appears solid with a nearly rotationally symmetrical body. Using a teapot model is considered the 3D equivalent of a "Hello, World!" program, a way to create an easy 3D scene with a somewhat complex model acting as the basic geometry for a scene with a light setup. Some programming libraries, such as the OpenGL Utility Toolkit, even have functions dedicated to drawing teapots.

The teapot model was created in 1975 by early computer graphics researcher Martin Newell, a member of the pioneering graphics program at the University of Utah. It was one of the first to be modeled using Bézier curves rather than precisely measured.

== History ==
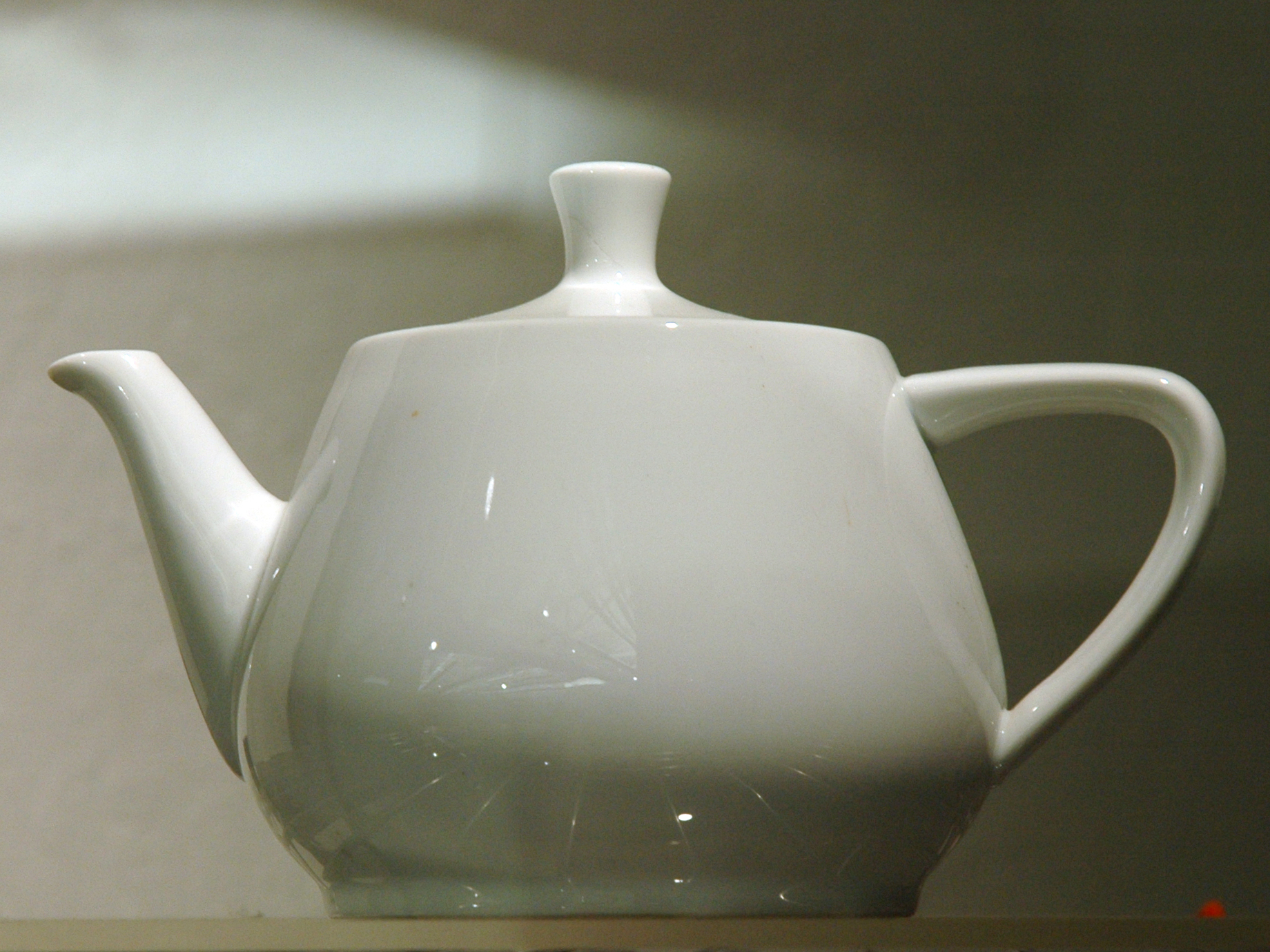
The actual Melitta teapot that Martin Newell modeled, displayed at the Computer History Museum in Mountain View, California (1990–present)

External image
- A scan of the original diagram Martin Newell drew up, to plan the Utah Teapot before inputing it digitally. Image courtesy of Computer History Museum.

For his work, Newell needed a simple mathematical model of a familiar object. His wife, Sandra Newell, suggested modeling their tea set since they were sitting down for tea at the time. He sketched the teapot free-hand using graph paper and a pencil. Following that, he went back to the computer laboratory and edited Bézier control points on a Tektronix storage tube, again by hand.

The teapot shape contained a number of elements that made it ideal for the graphics experiments of the time: it was round, contained saddle points, had a genus greater than zero because of the hole in the spout, could project a shadow on itself, and could be displayed accurately without a surface texture.

Newell made the mathematical data that described the teapot's geometry—a set of three-dimensional coordinates—publicly available, and soon other researchers began to use the same data for their computer graphics experiments. These researchers needed something with roughly the same characteristics that Newell had, and using the teapot data meant they did not have to laboriously enter geometric data for some other object. Although technical progress has meant that the act of rendering the teapot is no longer the challenge it was in 1975, the teapot continued to be used as a reference object for increasingly advanced graphics techniques.

Over the following decades, editions of computer graphics journals—such as the ACM SIGGRAPH's quarterly—regularly featured versions of the teapot: faceted or smooth-shaded, wireframe, bumpy, translucent, refractive, even leopard-skin and furry teapots were created.

Having no surface to represent its base, the original teapot model was not intended to be seen from below. Later versions of the data set fixed this.

The real teapot is 33% taller (ratio 4:3) than the computer model. Jim Blinn stated that he scaled the model on the vertical axis during a demo in the lab to demonstrate that they could manipulate it. They preferred the appearance of this new version and decided to save the file out of that preference.

Versions of the teapot model—or sample scenes containing it—are distributed with or freely available for nearly every current rendering and modeling program and even many graphic APIs, including AutoCAD, Houdini, Lightwave 3D, MODO, POV-Ray, 3ds Max, and the OpenGL and Direct3D helper libraries. Some RenderMan-compliant renderers support the teapot as a built-in geometry by calling RiGeometry("teapot", RI_NULL). Along with the expected cubes and spheres, the GLUT library even provides the function glutSolidTeapot() as a graphics primitive, as does its Direct3D counterpart D3DX (D3DXCreateTeapot()). While D3DX for Direct3D 11 does not provide this functionality anymore, it is supported in the DirectX Tool Kit. Mac OS X Tiger and Leopard also include the teapot as part of Quartz Composer; Leopard's teapot supports bump mapping. BeOS and Haiku include a small demo of a rotating 3D teapot, intended to show off the platform's multimedia facilities.

Teapot scenes are commonly used for renderer self-tests and benchmarks.

=== Original teapot model ===
The original, physical Melitta teapot was purchased from ZCMI—a department store in Salt Lake City—in 1974. It was donated to the Boston Computer Museum in 1984, where it was on display until 1990. It now resides in the ephemera collection at the Computer History Museum in Mountain View, California where it is catalogued as "Teapot used for Computer Graphics rendering" and bears the catalogue number X398.84. The original teapot the Utah teapot was based on was available from Porzellanfabrik Friesland, once part of the German Melitta group. Originally it was given the rather plain name Haushaltsteekanne ('household teapot'); the company only found out about their product's reputation in 2017, when a customer asked if the company had any CAD data of the teapot, whereupon they officially renamed it "Utah Teapot". It was available in three different sizes in various old and new pastel colors, as well as white; the one Martin Newell had used is the white "1.4 l Utah Teapot".

The original teapot is no longer in production, following a 2023 fire at Friesland Porzellan.

== Appearances ==
One famous ray-traced image, by James Arvo and David Kirk in 1987, shows six stone columns, five of which are surmounted by the Platonic solids—a tetrahedron, a cube, a octahedron, a dodecahedron, and an icosahedron. The sixth column supports a teapot. The image is titled "The Six Platonic Solids", with Arvo and Kirk calling the teapot "the newly discovered Teapotahedron". This image appeared on the covers of several books and computer graphic journals.

The Utah teapot appears as one of the demos in BeOS.

The Utah teapot sometimes appears in the "Pipes" screensaver shipped with Microsoft Windows, but only in versions prior to Windows XP.

Jim Blinn—in one of his "Project MATHEMATICS!" videos—proves an amusing—but trivial—version of the Pythagorean theorem: construct a (2D) teapot on each side of a right triangle and the area of the teapot on the hypotenuse is equal to the sum of the areas of the teapots on the other two sides.

Vulkan and OpenGL graphics APIs feature the Utah teapot along with the Stanford dragon and the Stanford bunny on their badges.

With the advent of the first computer-generated short films, and later full-length feature films, it has become an in-joke to hide the Utah teapot in films' scenes. For example, in the movie Toy Story, the Utah teapot appears in a short tea-party scene. The teapot also appears in The Simpsons episode "Treehouse of Horror VI" in which Homer discovers the "third dimension." In The Sims 2, a picture of the Utah teapot is one of the paintings available to buy in-game, titled "Handle and Spout".

An origami version of the teapot, folded by Tomohiro Tachi, was shown at the Tikotin Museum of Japanese Art in Israel in a 2007–2008 exhibit.

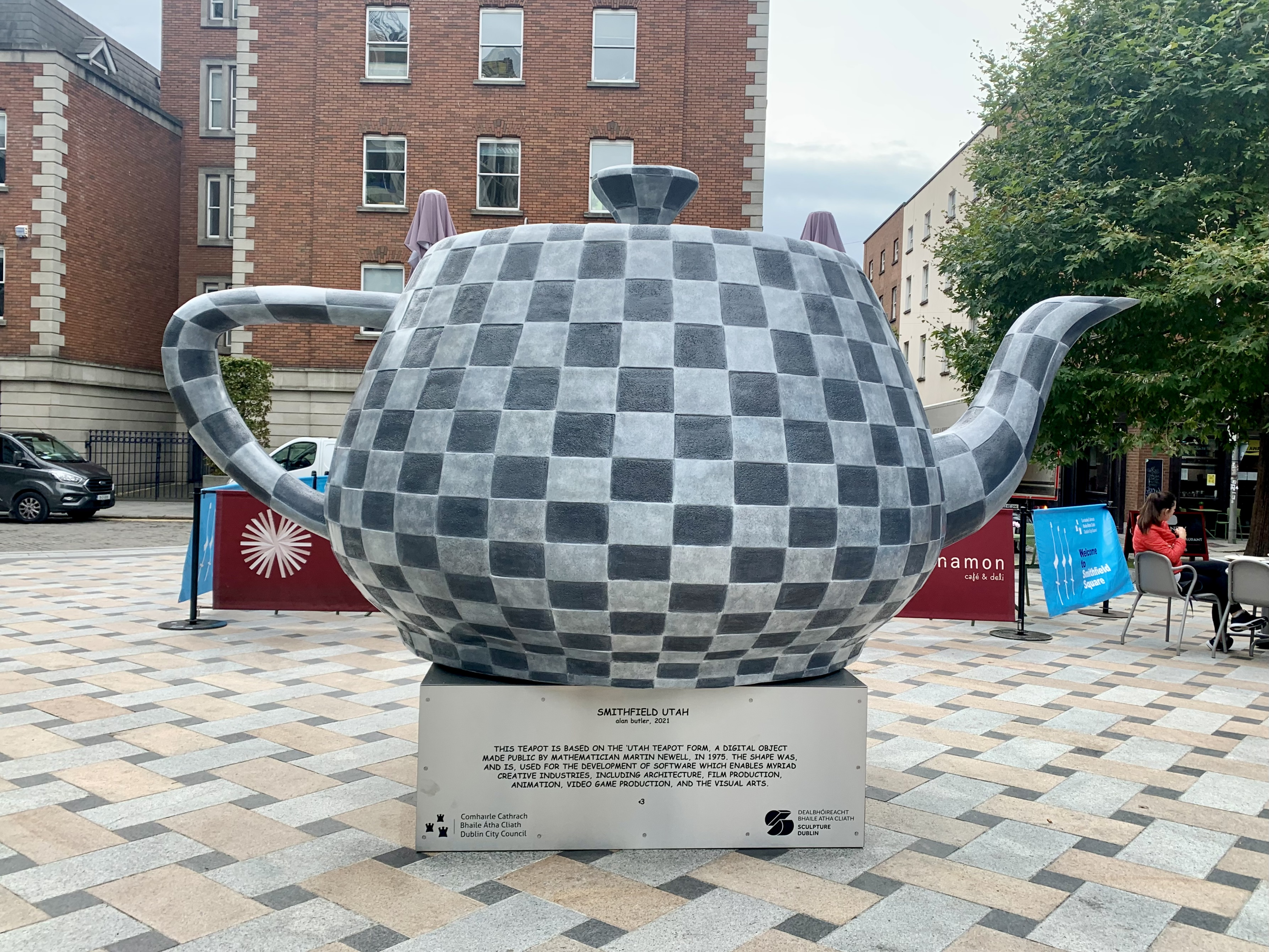
"Smithfield Utah" public sculpture in Dublin, Ireland

In October 2021 "Smithfield Utah" by Alan Butler which was inspired by the Utah teapot was unveiled in Dublin, Ireland.

== OBJ conversion ==
Although the original tea set by Newell can be downloaded directly, this tea set is specified using a set of Bézier patches in a custom format, which can be difficult to import directly into many popular 3D modeling applications. As such, a tesselated conversion of the dataset in the popular OBJ file format can be useful. One such conversion of the Newell teaset is available on the University of Utah website, although it does not include the milk pitcher that is shown in some of Newell's renders.

== Gallery ==
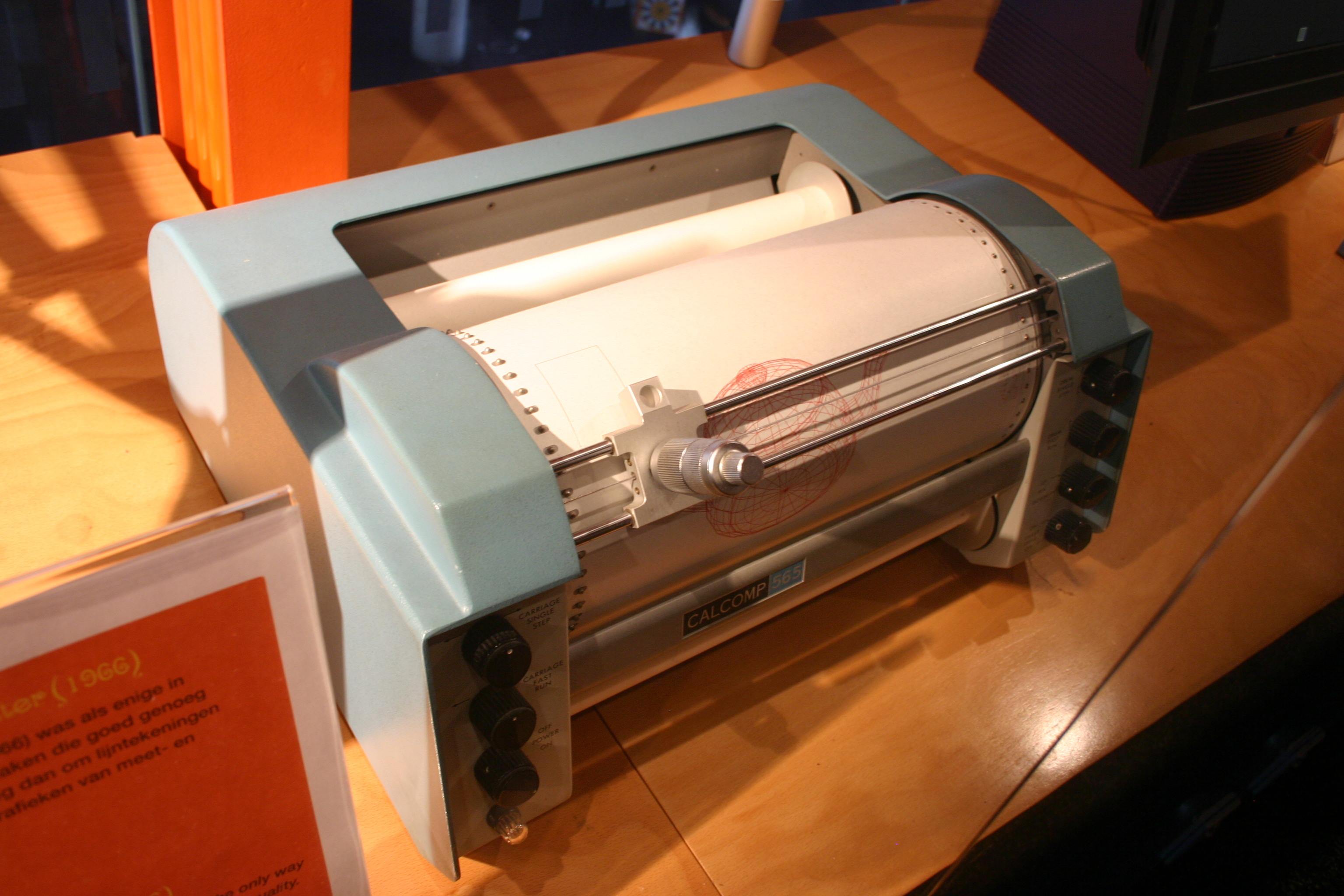
Wireframe Utah teapot on a 1960s-era Calcomp plotter

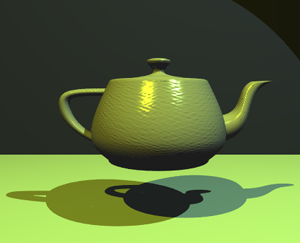
The Utah teapot

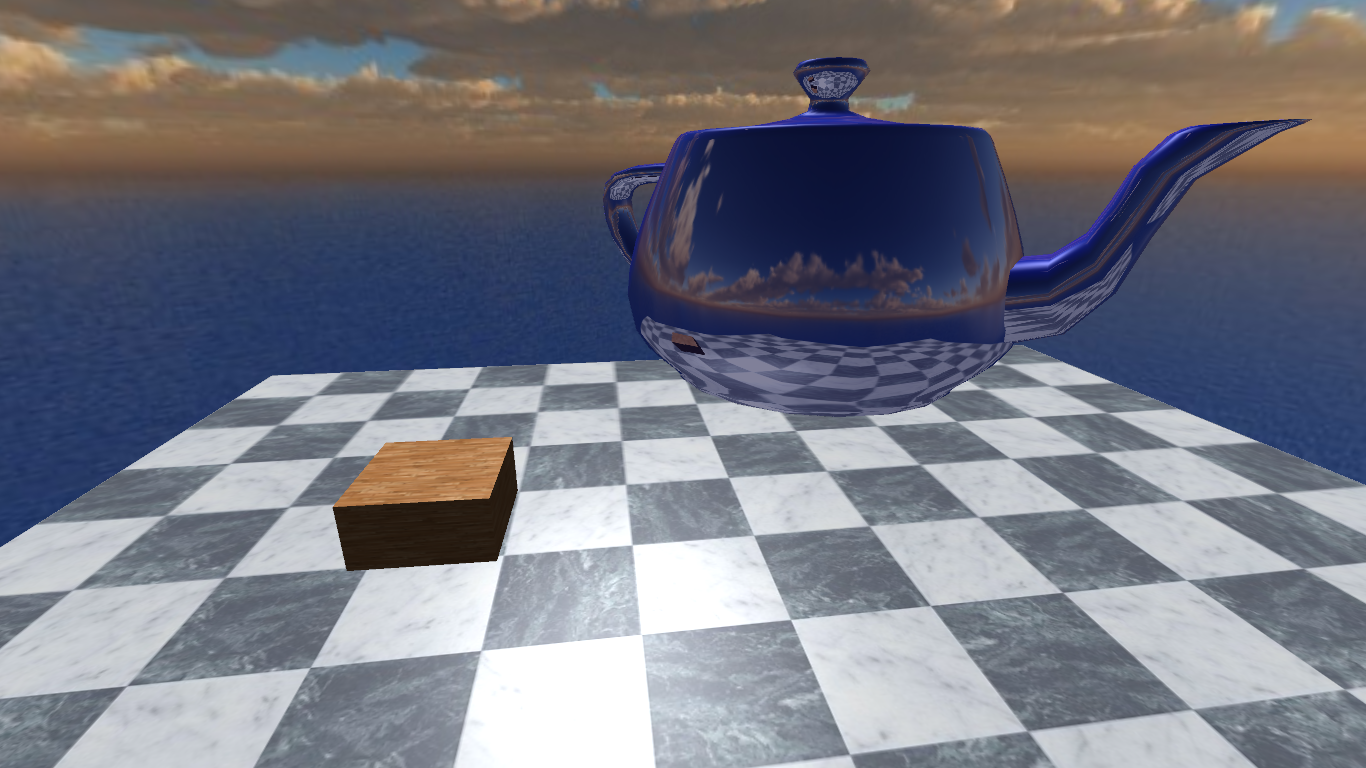
Environment mapping on the teapot

== See also ==
- List of common 3D test models
  - 3DBenchy
  - Cornell box
  - Stanford bunny
  - Stanford dragon
  - Suzanne (3D model)
- List of filmmaker's signatures
- Lenna
- Hyper Text Coffee Pot Control Protocol
