= Marc Levoy =

American computer graphics researcher

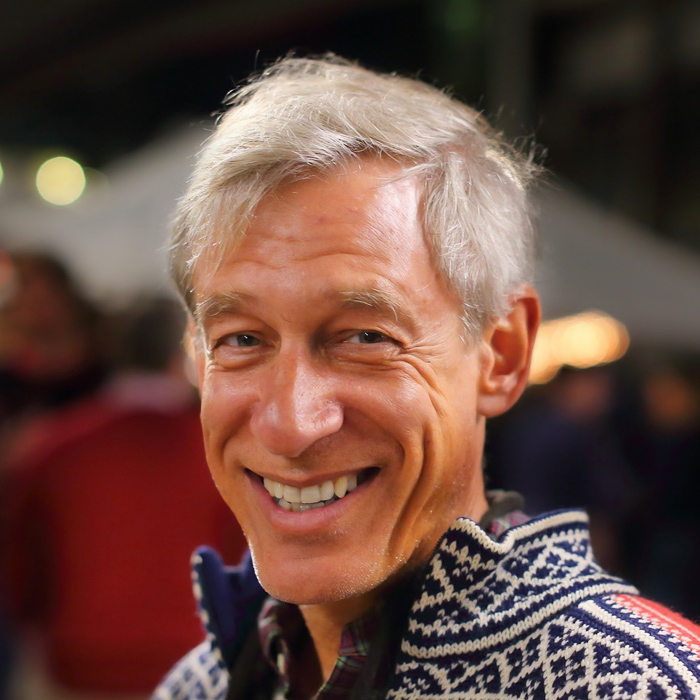
- Born: November 2, 1953 (age 72)
- Education: Cornell University; University of North Carolina at Chapel Hill
- Known for: Volume rendering Light fields 3D scanning Stanford Bunny; Computational photography
- Awards: SIGGRAPH Computer Graphics Achievement Award (1996), ACM Fellow (2007), National Academy of Engineering (2022)
- Scientific career
- Fields: Computer Graphics, Computer Vision
- Workplaces: Stanford University; Google, Adobe Inc.
- Thesis: Display of Surfaces From Volume Data (1989)
- Doctoral advisor: Henry Fuchs

Marc Stewart Levoy (born November 2, 1953) is an American computer graphics researcher and Professor Emeritus of Computer Science and Electrical Engineering at Stanford University, a vice president and Fellow at Adobe Inc., and (until 2020) a Distinguished Engineer at Google. He is noted for pioneering work in volume rendering, light fields, and computational photography.

== Education and early career ==
Levoy first studied computer graphics as an architecture student under Donald P. Greenberg at Cornell University. He received his B.Arch. in 1976 and M.S. in architecture in 1978. He developed a 2D computer animation system as part of his studies, receiving the Charles Goodwin Sands Memorial Medal for this work. Greenberg and he suggested to Disney that they use computer graphics in producing animated films, but the idea was rejected by several of the Nine Old Men who were still active. Following this, they were able to convince Hanna-Barbera Productions to use their system for television animation. Despite initial opposition by animators, the system was successful in reducing labor costs and helping to save the company, and was used until 1996. Levoy worked as director of the Hanna-Barbera Animation Laboratory from 1980 to 1983.

He then did graduate study in computer science under Henry Fuchs at the University of North Carolina at Chapel Hill, and received his Ph.D. in 1989. While there, he published several important papers in the field of volume rendering, developing new algorithms (such as volume ray tracing), improving efficiency, and demonstrating applications of the technique.

== Teaching career ==
He joined the faculty of Stanford's Computer Science Department in 1990. In 1991, he received the National Science Foundation's Presidential Young Investigator Award. In 1994, he co-created the Stanford Bunny, which has become an icon of computer graphics. In 1996, he and Pat Hanrahan coauthored the paper, "Light Field Rendering," which forms the basis behind many image-based rendering techniques in modern-day computer graphics. His lab also worked on applications of light fields, developing technologies such as a light-field camera and light-field microscope, and on computational photography.

The phrase "computational photography" was first used by Steve Mann in 1995. It was re-coined and given a broader meaning by Levoy for a course he taught at Stanford in 2004 and a symposium he co-organized in 2005.

== Google and Adobe ==
Levoy took a leave of absence from Stanford in 2011 to work at GoogleX as part of Project Glass. In 2014, he retired from Stanford to become full-time at Google, where until 2020 he led a team in Google Research that worked broadly on cameras and photography.

One of his projects was HDR+ mode for Google Pixel smartphones. In 2016, the French agency DxO gave the Pixel the highest rating ever given to a smartphone camera, and again in 2017 for the Pixel 2. His team also developed Portrait Mode, a single-camera background defocus technology launched in October 2017 on Pixel 2, and Night Sight, a technology for taking handheld pictures without flash in very low light launched in November 2018 on all generations of Pixel phones.

His team worked on underlying technologies for Project Jump, a 360 degree camera that captures stereo panoramic videos for VR headsets.

Although Levoy no longer teaches at Stanford, a course he taught on digital photography that was rerecorded at Google in 2016 is available online for free.

Levoy left Google in March 2020 and joined Adobe Inc. as vice president and fellow in July. In 2024 his Adobe team launched technologies for automatically adjusting tone and color in HDR photographs and for removing reflections from windows. In 2025 his team launched an experimental computational photography camera app called Project indigo.

== Awards and honors ==
For his work in volume rendering, Levoy was the recipient of the ACM SIGGRAPH Computer Graphics Achievement Award in 1996. In 2007, he was inducted as a Fellow of the Association for Computing Machinery "for contributions to computer graphics". In 2022 he was elected to the National Academy of Engineering "for contributions to computer graphics and digital photography".

== Notable publications ==
- Marc Levoy (May 1988). "Display of Surfaces from Volume Data". IEEE Computer Graphics and Applications. 8 (3).
- Philippe Lacroute & Marc Levoy. "Fast Volume Rendering Using a Shear-Warp Factorization of the Viewing Transformation". Proceedings of SIGGRAPH 1994.
- Brian Curless & Marc Levoy. "A Volumetric Method for Building Complex Models from Range Images". Proceedings of SIGGRAPH 1996. ^{[s]}
- Henrik Wann Jensen; Steve Marschner; Marc Levoy & Pat Hanrahan. "A Practical Model for Subsurface Light Transport". Proceedings of SIGGRAPH 1991. ^{[s]} (winner of a 2004 Academy Award for Technical Achievement)
- Marc Levoy & Pat Hanrahan. "Light Field Rendering". Proceedings of SIGGRAPH 1996. ^{[s]}
- Marc Levoy; Kari Pulli; Brian Curless; Szymon Rusinkiewicz; David Koller; Lucas Pereira; Matt Ginzton; Sean Anderson; James Davis; Jeremy Ginsberg; Jonathan Shade & Duane Fulk. "The Digital Michelangelo Project: 3D scanning of large statues". Proceedings of SIGGRAPH 2000. ^{[s]}
- Marc Levoy; Ren Ng; Andrew Adams; Matthew Footer; Mark Horowitz. "Light Field Microscopy". Proceedings of SIGGRAPH 2006.
- Andrew Adams; Eino-Ville (Eddy) Talvala; Sung Hee Park; David E. Jacobs; Boris Ajdin; Natasha Gelfand; Jennifer Dolson; Daniel Vaquero; Jongmin Baek; Marius Tico; Henrik P.A. Lensch; Wojciech Matusik; Kari Pulli; Mark Horowitz & Marc Levoy. "The Frankencamera: An Experimental Platform for Computational Photography" (PDF). Communications of the ACM. doi:10.1145/2366316.2366339. S2CID 10154698. (November 2012)
- Samuel W. Hasinoff; Dillon Sharlet; Ryan Geiss; Andrew Adams; Jonathan T. Barron; Florian Kainz; Jiawen Chen & Marc Levoy. "Burst photography for high dynamic range and low-light imaging on mobile cameras" (PDF). Proceedings of SIGGRAPH Asia 2016. (paper on HDR+)
- Jonathan Ragan-Kelley; Andrew Adams; Connelly Barnes; Dillon Sharlet; Sylvain Paris; Marc Levoy; Saman Amarasinghe & Fredo Durand. "Halide: decoupling algorithms from schedules for high performance image processing" (PDF). Communications of the ACM. doi:10.1145/3150211. (January, 2018) ^{[s]}
- Neal Wadhwa, Rahul Garg, David E. Jacobs, Bryan E. Feldman, Nori Kanazawa, Robert Carroll, Yair Movshovitz-Attias, Jonathan T. Barron, Yael Pritch, Marc Levoy, "Synthetic Depth-of-Field with a Single-Camera Mobile Phone" (PDF), Proceedings of SIGGRAPH 2018. (paper on Portrait Mode)
- Orly Liba, Kiran Murthy, Yun-Ta Tsai, Tim Brooks, Tianfan Xue, Nikhil Karnad, Qiurui He, Jonathan T. Barron, Dillon Sharlet, Ryan Geiss, Samuel W. Hasinoff, Yael Pritch, Marc Levoy, "Handheld Mobile Photography in Very Low Light " (PDF), Proceedings of SIGGRAPH Asia 2019. (paper on Night Sight)

== Notes ==
[s] - Reprinted in Mary C. Whitton, ed. (2023). Seminal Graphics Papers: Pushing the Boundaries, Volume 2. ACM. doi:10.1145/3596711. ISBN 979-8-4007-0897-8. (August, 2023)
