= Stanford bunny =

Computer graphics 3D reference model

The Stanford bunny

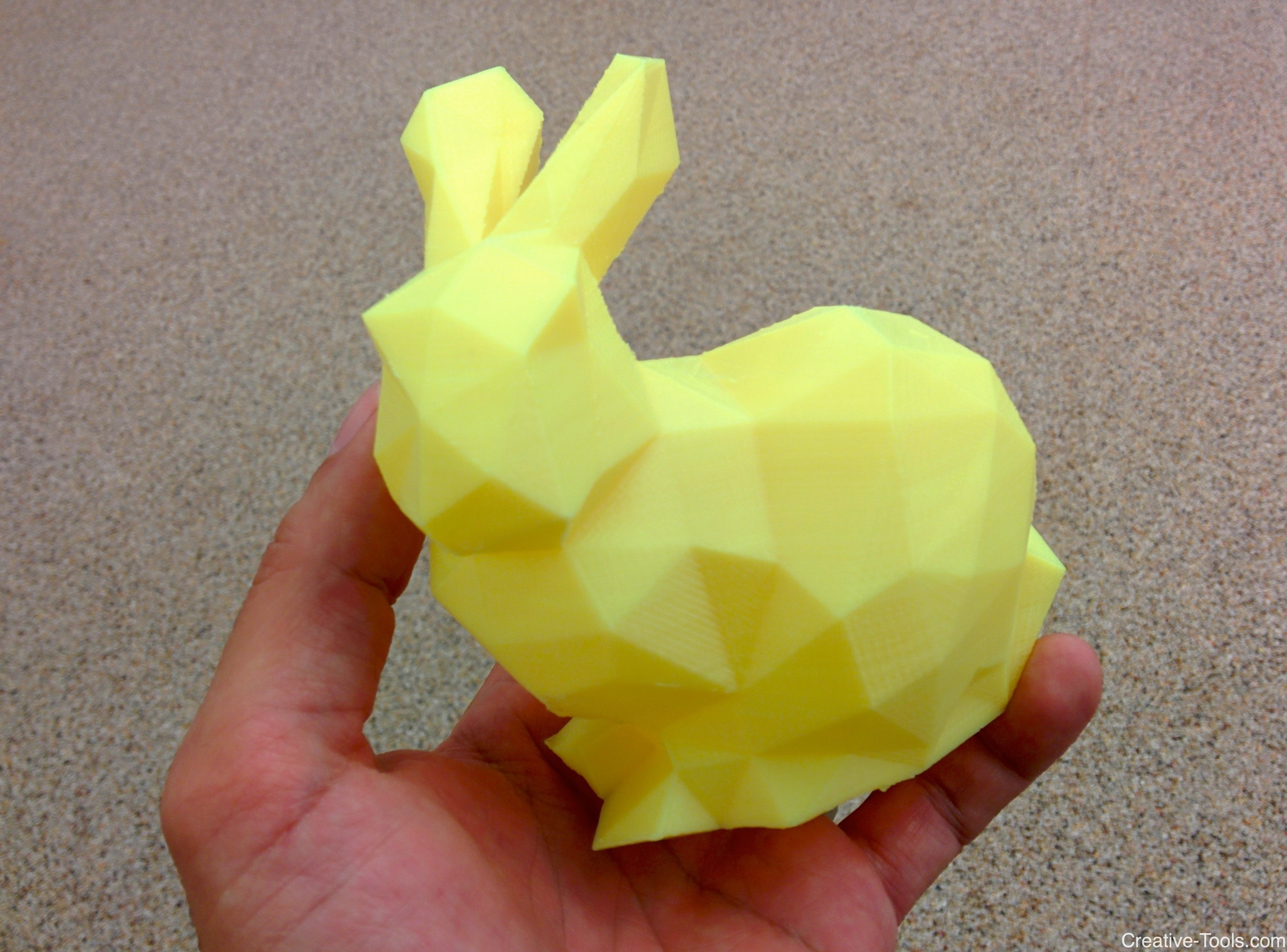
A 3D printed low poly Stanford bunny

The Stanford bunny is a computer graphics 3D test model developed by Greg Turk and Marc Levoy in 1994 at Stanford University. The model consists of 69,451 triangles, with the data determined by 3D scanning a ceramic figurine of a rabbit. This figurine and others were scanned to test methods of range scanning physical objects.

The data can be used to test various graphics algorithms, including polygonal simplification, compression, and surface smoothing. There are a few complications with this dataset that can occur in any 3D scan data: the model is manifold connected and has holes in the data, some due to scanning limits and some due to the object being hollow. These complications provide a more realistic input for any algorithm that is benchmarked with the Stanford bunny, though by today's standards, in terms of geometric complexity and triangle count, it is considered a simple model.

The model was originally available in .ply (polygons) file format in four different resolutions.

The model can be found at https://graphics.stanford.edu/data/3Dscanrep/

== See also ==
- 3D modeling
- Stanford dragon
- Utah teapot
- Suzanne (3D model)
- Cornell box
- List of common 3D test models
