= Stanford dragon =

Computer graphics 3D test model

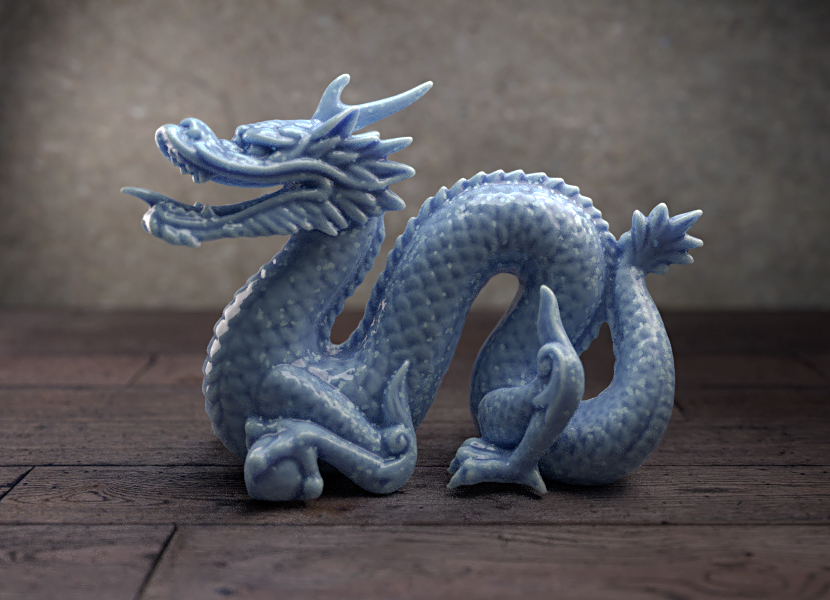
Computer-generated render of the Stanford dragon

The Stanford dragon is a computer graphics 3D test model created with a Cyberware 3030 Model Shop (MS) Color 3D scanner at Stanford University. Data for the model was produced in 1996.

The dragon consists of data describing 871,414 triangles (Note: Although the Stanford web page says that it has 1,132,830 triangles, the actual face count is 871,414 in the .ply file.) determined by 3D scanning a real figurine. The data set is often used to test various graphics algorithms, including polygonal simplification, compression, and surface smoothing, similar to the Stanford bunny (1993).

The model is available in different file formats (ply, vrml, vl, etc.) on the Internet for free.

== See also ==
- List of common 3D test models
- Stanford bunny
