= NDT =

NDT may refer to:

- National Debate Tournament, a national championship of intercollegiate policy debate
- Ndunga language, represented by ISO 639 code ndt
- Nederlands Dans Theater
- Neolithic discontinuity theory
- Neil deGrasse Tyson (born 1958), American astrophysicist
- Neue Deutsche Todeskunst, a music genre
- Neurodevelopmental treatment
- Newfoundland Daylight Time
- Nil ductility temperature, the temperature at which brittle fracture in a normally ductile material becomes 100 percent cleavage
- Nondestructive testing, a type of testing which does not damage or destroy the original object
- Noriko's Dinner Table (2006), a Japanese film by Sono Sion
- Normal distributions transform, a point cloud registration algorithm
- Nephrology Dialysis Transplantation, a medical nephrology journal
- Nuclear disablement teams, units within the U.S. military that deny access to nuclear capabilities.
