= Autoware =

Japanese open-source software operating system

- Original authors: Shinpei Kato, et al.
- Developer: The Autoware Foundation
- Release: August 25, 2015; 11 years ago
- Written in: C++, others
- Operating system: Linux, ROS
- Type: Autonomous driving
- License: Apache License 2.0
- Website: www.autoware.org
- Repository: github.com/autowarefoundation/

Autoware is a Japanese open-source software operating system for autonomous vehicles. It is based on Linux and the Robot Operating System (ROS).

== Overview ==
Autoware was jointly developed by Shinpei Kato while he was an associate professor at Nagoya University, in collaboration with Nagasaki University and the National Institute of Advanced Industrial Science and Technology (AIST). It is designed for the purpose of autonomous driving on public roads in urban areas.

Its design philosophy is modeled after Linux, with an emphasis placed on being open-source from the beginning of its development. As of 2018, development is led by The Autoware Foundation (AWF) and Tier IV.

The software stack provides a complete set of self-driving modules, including localization, detection, prediction, planning, and control. It is designed for urban driving rather than highway driving, inspired by the achievements of the DARPA Urban Challenge.

== Architecture ==
Autoware relies on the Robot Operating System (ROS) for its component-based middleware framework, using a publish/subscribe model for communication between software nodes. The system abstracts autonomous driving into three main phases: sensing, computing, and actuation. The platform uses Data Distribution Service (DDS) as its middleware for data transmission, which creates sockets between publishers and subscribers and serializes data packets.

- Sensing: Supports input from LiDAR scanners (e.g., Velodyne), cameras (e.g., PointGrey), GNSS, and IMUs. It uses Point Cloud Library (PCL) for managing 3D data and CUDA for GPU acceleration.
- Computing:
  - Localization: Estimates position using satellite signals and LiDAR-based normal distributions transform (NDT). It employs an Extended Kalman filter (EKF) to fuse sensor outputs for accuracy.
  - Perception: Uses algorithms like NDT for localization and scan matching with 3D maps. For object detection, it employs deep learning frameworks like Caffe and SSD, alongside traditional methods using OpenCV. It utilizes model-based approaches (e.g., L-Shape Fitting) combined with data-driven techniques (e.g., PointPillars, YOLOX).
  - Decision & Planning: Implements state machines for decision-making and uses algorithms like hybrid-state A* and lattice-based planners for trajectory generation. The planning module generates routes and executes lane and parking scenarios in parallel, activating specific scenarios based on proximity to the destination.
- Actuation: Generates steering and throttle commands using a pure pursuit algorithm and PID controllers to follow generated paths. The control module provides separate lateral (e.g., MPC, Pure Pursuit) and longitudinal (PID) controllers.

A specific profile called "Autoware on Board" has been developed to enable the software on embedded systems, such as the NVIDIA Drive PX2, optimizing for ARM-based processing cores.

== Adoptions and projects ==
- Milee, Logiee, Postee (Tier IV)
- e-Palette (Toyota)
- MIH (Foxconn)
- RoboCar (ZMP)
- Udacity: Integrated as the base for their online self-driving car engineer nanodegree.
- AutonomouStuff: Used to produce autonomous vehicle platforms.

== See also ==
- Self-driving car
- Robot Operating System
- Apollo (autonomous driving platform)

== Sources ==
- Jung, Hee-Yang; Paek, Dong-Hee; Kong, Seung-Hyun (2025). "Open-Source Autonomous Driving Software Platforms: Comparison of Autoware and Apollo 2501.18942". arXiv:2501.18942 [cs.RO].
- Kato, Shinpei; Tokunaga, Shota; Maruyama, Yuya; Maeda, Seiya; Hirabayashi, Manato; Kitsukawa, Yuki; Monrroy, Abraham; Ando, Tomohito; Fujii, Yusuke; Azumi, Takuya (2018). Autoware on Board: Enabling Autonomous Vehicles with Embedded Systems. 2018 9th ACM/IEEE International Conference on Cyber-Physical Systems (ICCPS). IEEE. pp. 287–296. doi:10.1109/ICCPS.2018.00035. ISBN 978-1-5386-5301-2.
- 自動運転OS「Autoware」、FoxconnのMIHで採用か ティアフォーが開発 [Autonomous driving OS "Autoware" likely adopted by Foxconn's MIH; Developed by Tier IV]. Jidounten Lab (in Japanese). 2021-03-23.
- ZMP、RoboCar SUV向け自動運転用ソフトウェア Autoware 導入オプションを発売 [ZMP releases Autoware installation option for RoboCar SUV autonomous driving software]. Response (in Japanese). 2019-09-12.
- オープンソースの自動運転OS「Autoware」で世界をリードする ティアフォーが「TECH PLAYER OF THE YEAR賞」を受賞 [Tier IV, leading the world with open-source autonomous driving OS "Autoware", wins "TECH PLAYER OF THE YEAR"]. TECH PLAY (in Japanese). 2020-07-22.
