= OpenPCL =

The term OpenPCL may refer to:

- OpenPCL, a SourceForge hosted open source project for a computer program that can read and display Printer Command Language (PCL) data sets, as normally intended for use with 2D printers.
- The self declared open Point Cloud Library (PCL) project, a software project that aims displaying various 3D data sets.
