= MeshLab =

3D mesh processing software system

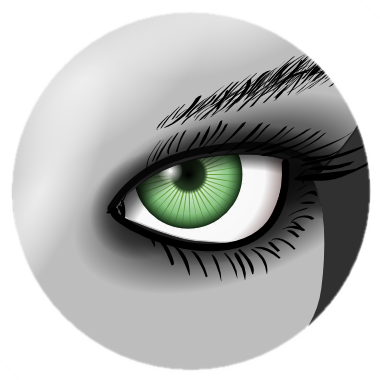

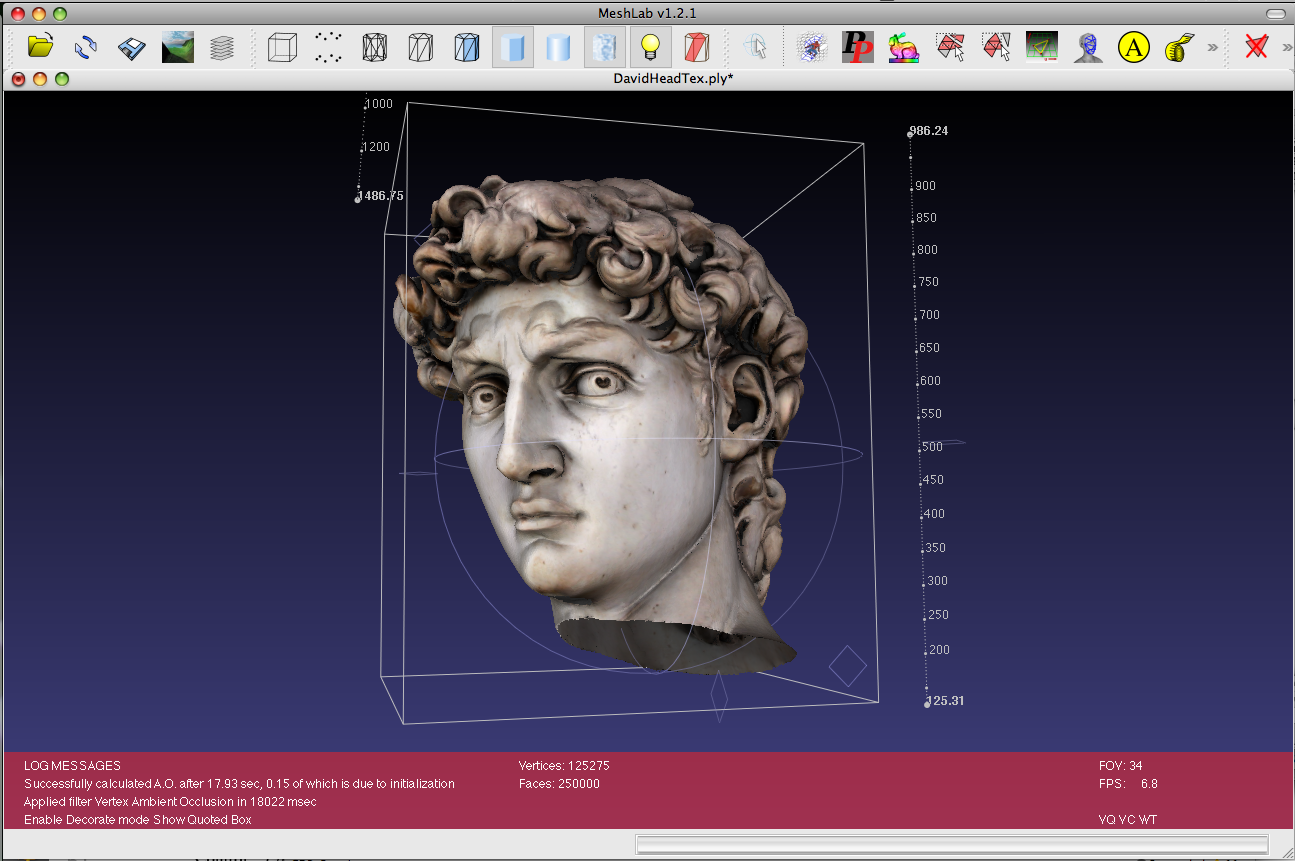
- MeshLab
- Developer: ISTI - CNR
- Stable release: 2025.07 / 22 July 2025
- Preview release: https://github.com/cnr-isti-vclab/meshlab/releases (monthly beta releases)
- Repository: github.com/cnr-isti-vclab/meshlab
- Written in: C++, JavaScript
- Operating system: Cross-platform
- Type: Graphics software
- License: GPL - Open source
- Website: www.meshlab.net www.meshlabjs.net

MeshLab is a 3D mesh processing software system that is oriented to the management and processing of unstructured large meshes and provides a set of tools for editing, cleaning, healing, inspecting, rendering, and converting these kinds of meshes. MeshLab is free and open-source software, subject to the requirements of the GNU General Public License (GPL), version 2 or later, and is used as both a complete package and a library powering other software. It is well known in the more technical fields of 3D development and data handling.

== Overview ==
MeshLab is developed by the ISTI - CNR research center; initially MeshLab was created as a course assignment at the University of Pisa in late 2005. It is a general-purpose system aimed at the processing of the typical not-so-small unstructured 3D models that arise in the 3D scanning pipeline.

The automatic mesh cleaning filters includes removal of duplicated, unreferenced vertices, non-manifold edges, vertices, and null faces. Remeshing tools support high quality simplification based on quadric error measure, various kinds of subdivision surfaces, and two surface reconstruction algorithms from point clouds based on the ball-pivoting technique and on the Poisson surface reconstruction approach. For the removal of noise, usually present in acquired surfaces, MeshLab supports various kinds of smoothing filters and tools for curvature analysis and visualization.

It includes a tool for the registration of multiple range maps based on the iterative closest point algorithm. MeshLab also includes an interactive direct paint-on-mesh system that allows users to interactively change the color of a mesh, to define selections and to directly smooth out noise and small features.

MeshLab is available for most platforms, including Linux, Mac OS X, Windows and, with reduced functionality, on Android and iOS and even as a pure client-side JavaScript application called MeshLabJS. The system supports input/output in the following formats: PLY, STL, OFF, OBJ, 3DS, VRML 2.0, X3D and COLLADA. MeshLab can also import point clouds reconstructed using Photosynth.

MeshLab is used in various academic and research contexts, like microbiology, cultural heritage, surface reconstruction, paleontology, for rapid prototyping in orthopedic surgery, in orthodontics, and desktop manufacturing.

== Additional images ==
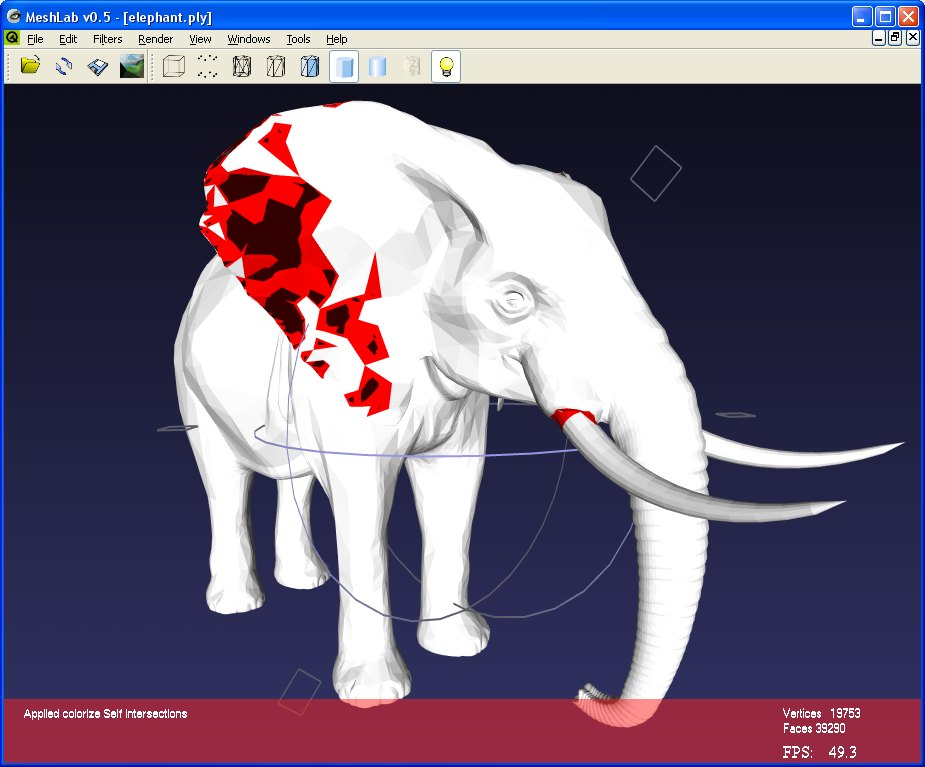
Animal.

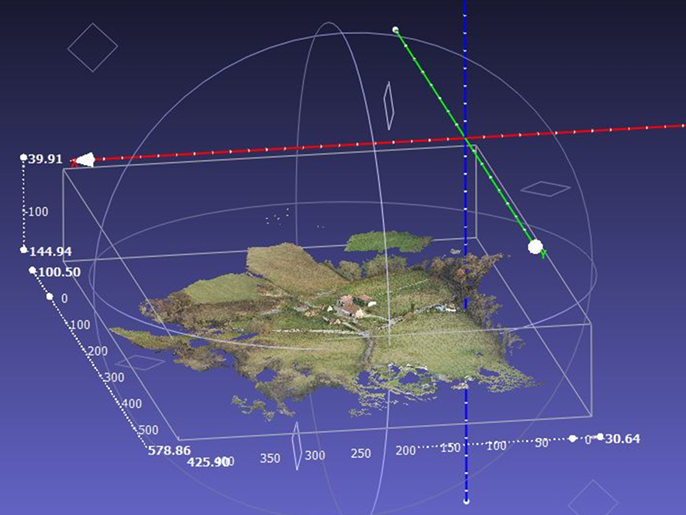
Geographical data.

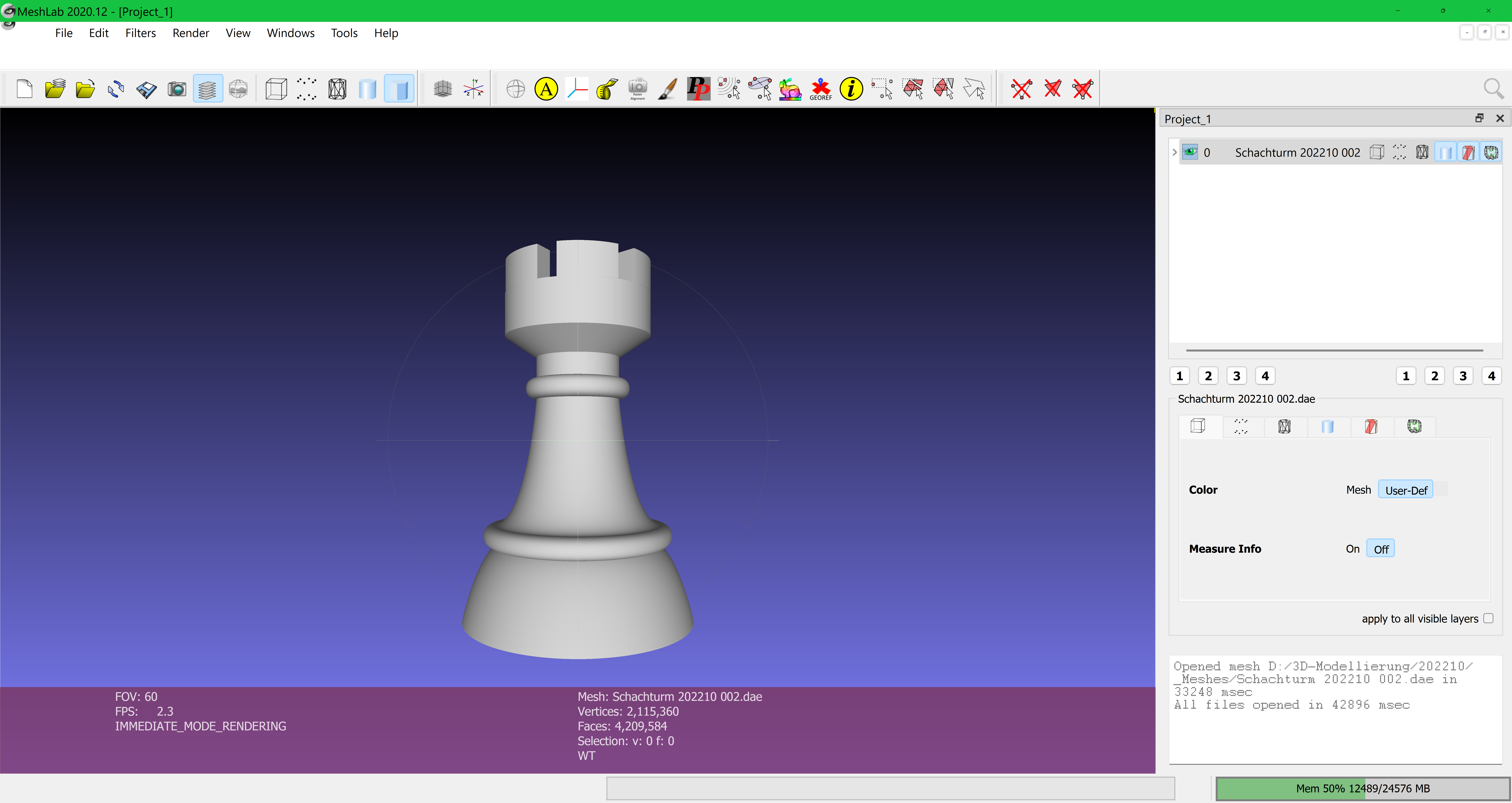
Version 2020.12

== See also ==
- Geometry processing
- 3D scanner
- List of free and open source CAD software
- List of 3D printing software
