= Holoverse =

Amusement attraction on the Gold Coast, Queensland, Australia

Coordinates: 28.0026°S 153.4299°E

Holoverse is an amusement attraction on the Gold Coast, Australia, that opened in June 2016.

The centre is owned by Euclideon Entertainment, founded by Bruce Dell in 2017, who developed the technology for the public to experience the holograms.

Holoverse uses entertainment technology that creates artificial environments and objects that are described as holograms.

== History ==
The centre was partially funded by the Australian Government.

It was opened by the Premier of Queensland, Annastacia Palaszczuk.

The centre contains 40 hologram rooms, is the first centre of its kind in Australia, and is said to house the largest number of them in the world. In November 2018, Holoverse's parent company Euclideon announced it would be installing their new 'hologram arcade tables' into Holoverse.

== Experiences ==
New content is released by the mother company Euclideon every three months. While primarily for entertainment, other experiences focus on educational content for schools and interactive learning experiences. So far the centre has six experiences / sessions:

- Experiences: Volume 1
- False Eden
- Fly Over the Gold Coast
- Holographic Planetarium (Two parts)
- Veggie Patch Valley
- Dinosaur Experience
- Holographic Arcade Tables

== Expansion ==
On February 12, 2019, the 2nd Holoverse center in the world, opened in Muscat, Oman.

== Technology ==
The technology, when used in other fields, is often referred to as a virtual reality cave or VR CAVE environment. To create a Hologram, a series of items are used including projectors, flat and angular surfaces, 3D glasses, tracking domes, tracking spheres and 3D animated, and graphical scenarios containing millions of tiny digital spheres called "atoms". In many cases there is also the presence of laser scanned objects.

The technology differs from standard virtual reality, in which users wear screens over their eyes, headsets through which they are unable to see their own torso, arms or legs. Whereas in a VR CAVE, instead of going into the computer game, the person wears clear glasses and can see their own body, the computer-generated objects appearing to be in the real world with them.
