= Euclideon =

Australian computer graphics company

Euclideon Pty Ltd
- Type: Private
- Industry: Graphics Rendering / Information Technology / Holographic Entertainment
- Founded: 2010
- Headquarters: Brisbane, Australia
- Website: euclideon.com

Euclideon Pty Ltd was an Australian computer software company known for a middleware 3D graphics engine, called Unlimited Detail. Euclideon is also the parent company and operator of Holoverse, a 'holographic entertainment centre' located on the Gold Coast, in Queensland, Australia. Euclideon claims that Unlimited Detail is based on a point cloud search engine indexing system and that the technology can provide 'unlimited graphics power', proposing it as a replacement for polygon-based rendering.

In 2010 Euclideon was the recipient of approximately $2 million, the largest grant awarded by the Australian Federal Government under its new Commercialisation Australia initiative. The funds provided by the grant are meant to support the implementation of multi-platform functionality, allowing Euclideon's technology to run on a variety of hardware platforms, including mobile phones and game consoles.

The company went into administration in February 2024.

== Unlimited Detail ==
Unlimited Detail is described by Euclideon as a form of point cloud Search engine indexing system, which uses a large number of individual points to create models, instead of a more traditional polygon mesh. According to their description, the engine uses a search algorithm to determine which of these points are visible on-screen, and then displays only these points. On a 1024 × 768 display, for example, the engine would display only 786,432 visible points in each frame. As the engine is displaying the same number of points in every frame, the level of geometric detail provided is limited only by the amount of hard-drive space needed to store the point cloud data, and the rendering speed is limited only by the screen resolution.

Euclideon have previously described their technique as being a voxel rasterizer, but decided to use their own terminology such as "3D atoms" and "point cloud", saying that the word "voxels" doesn't have the prestige in the games industry that it enjoys in medicine and the sciences".

=== History ===
The project was first showcased at the Australian Game Developers Conference in 2003.

In 2011, Euclideon gained worldwide attention online when it released a number of video demos showcasing its 'Unlimited Detail' technology, attracting both skepticism and interest from the gaming press. Minecraft developer Markus Persson was critical of the demos, arguing that Euclideon portrays the software as "revolutionary" while it may suffer the same limitations as existing voxel renderers. John Carmack said the technology has "no chance of a game on current gen systems, but maybe several years from now." and Crytek's Cevat Yerli called the technology "definitely credible." Euclideon later released several interviews with CEO Bruce Dell responding to critics' concerns.

In September 2012 Bruce Dell filed a patent describing the rendering algorithm said to be used in Euclideon's software. The patent application was published on 27 March 2014.

The Unlimited Detail Engine was described in a review of DigiDoc Scotland by CyArk as "incredible" and "game changing". Shortly after, Euclideon was a sponsor and attendee at ILMF in Denver, 11–13 February 2013, showcasing Unlimited Detail enabled products.

In May 2013, another demonstration of the capabilities of the Euclideon 3D Engine showcases the Geoverse, where geospatial use is highlighted with the newly offered SDK.

In June 2013 a former employee of Euclidean claimed that a significant number of staff were let go, mentioning that clients were very impressed with Euclideon's technology and that plans are in place to develop the Infinite Detail engine to "a stage where it could eventually be utilised for games".

Euclideon appeared again in 2014 with a new video on their YouTube channel showcasing their solid laser scan technology and announced that they are currently working on 2 games and plan to open a gaming division in 2015.

In 2016 Euclideon released another video in which it described its approach to the VR (virtual reality) market as "revolutionary", claiming to have created real-life hologram rooms. They've announced that they will open a 4D hologram room entertainment arcade on 4 June 2016 located at Southport, Queensland, Australia. The project itself goes under the name "Holoverse". In August 2017, Euclideon developed multi-user hologram table, which allows four people to interact simultaneously with images projected onto the table surface.

In November 2018, Euclideon released a video unveiling what it calls a 'hologram arcade table'. In the video, Bruce Dell described it as an arcade table that uses 'holographic technology' to play games, and that the table 'creates objects out of light that float in the air about 90 centimeters away from the surface'. Euclideon displayed their hologram arcade table at IAAPA 2018 in Orlando, Florida.

In July 2020, Euclideon released udStream, a 3D data visualisation tool aimed at geospatial users. The product was released on a freemium model, offering capped levels of data storage to entry-level customers.

== Geoverse Suite ==
Geoverse Suite is intended to allow users to view terabytes of point cloud data from laser scans of cities and terrain. The point cloud is intended to be viewable within a second of the file being loaded, and at high frame rate. It is stated that as opposed to be loaded into RAM, the data is streamed from a local hard drive or it can be streamed from a USB drive or over a network connection.

The Geoverse Suite currently contains two software products – Geoverse Massive Data Manager (Geoverse MDM) and Geoverse Convert. The software requirements for Geoverse MDM recommend 2 GiB of RAM.

Geoverse Convert is the tool that is used to convert typical mesh and point cloud formats into Euclideon's proprietary streamable UDS (Unlimited Detail Data Set) format.

Geoverse MDM allows users to view these UDS files using the Unlimited Detail technology. UDS files may be streamed from external servers or the internet without having to first download the files. It also contains standard industry features such as placing bookmarks, labels and taking measurements.

On 30 September 2013, Merrick & Company (a $116 million geospatial technology firm), announced that it has signed an agreement with Euclideon to distribute the Geoverse software product line within North America.

In July 2013, the Austrian company Meixner Imaging GmbH, part of Meixner Group – one of Europe's leading geospatial companies, have signed an agreement that appoints Meixner as the premium distributor for Geoverse software throughout Europe.

== Solidscan ==
Solidscan is the latest software available to the public for purchase. Solidscan 'converts a laser scan into a solid, photo-realistic representation of the real world.' Solidscan's technology is said to improve the visual quality of laser scanner data (which typically appears as a sparse array of points) while preserving object dimensions.

== Web streaming technology ==
In 2014, Euclideon released its first demo available for the public in the form of a web viewer. Codenamed 'udWeb', the technology allows users browsing using the Google Chrome browser to stream multi-gigabyte point cloud models through to their browser without a plugin. The demonstration appeared to be faster than traditional streaming approaches, but no product has been released and the demo was taken down.

== Holoverse ==
In June 2016, the company opened Holoverse, a 'holographic entertainment center in Southport funded by a grant from the Federal Government along with private equity, allowing visitors to step into hologram rooms and be "transported to other worlds".

In March 2017 the Gold Coast Bulletin announced that Euclideon will be opening numerous Holoverse centers around the world with the next center opening in Oman. In November 2018, Euclideon announced that they will be opening their second Holoverse location in Muscat, Oman.

== See also ==
- Sparse voxel octree
- Search algorithm
- Search engine indexing
- Point cloud
- Lidar
