= Marc Alexa =

Computer scientist

- Born: 1 February 1974 (age 52); Darmstadt, Germany
- Education: TU Darmstadt (M.S. and Ph.D.)
- Scientific career
- Fields: Computer graphics, geometric modeling, geometry processing
- Workplaces: TU Darmstadt; TU Berlin
- Thesis: Shape Spaces from Morphing (2002)
- Doctoral advisor: José Luis Encarnação
- Notable students: Olga Sorkine-Hornung
- Website: www.cg.tu-berlin.de

Marc Alexa is a professor of computer science at TU Berlin working in the fields of computer graphics, geometric modeling and geometry processing.

== Life ==
Alexa studied computer science at TU Darmstadt, receiving a Diplom in 1997 and a PhD in 2002. After his graduation, he spent time as a postdoctoral researcher with Greg Turk at Georgia Tech, returning the same year to become assistant professor at TU Darmstadt. In 2005, he became an associate professor for computer graphics at TU Berlin, transitioning to the full professorship in 2010. He conducted research at Caltech, Carnegie Mellon University, Disney Research, ETH Zurich, and the University of Toronto. From 2018 to 2021, he was the editor-in-chief of ACM Transactions on Graphics.

== Awards ==
Alexa received numerous best paper awards at conferences, in particular the Symposium on Geometry Processing. Other noteworthy distinctions:

- 2024: ACM Fellow
- 2022: ERC Advanced Grant
- 2018: Fellow of the Eurographics Association
- 2014: Eurographics Outstanding Technical Contributions Award
- 2012: Engineering Sciences Prize of the Academy, Berlin-Brandenburg Academy of Sciences and Humanities
- 2010: ERC Starting Grant
- 2003: Heinz Maier-Leibnitz-Preis of the German Research Foundation
