= Shape Modeling International =

Shape Modeling International (SMI), also known as International Conference on Shape Modeling and Applications, is an annual symposium whose goal is to promote the dissemination of new mathematical theories and novel computational techniques for modeling, simulating, and processing digital shape representations. Initiated in 1997 by Tosyiasu L. Kunii and Bianca Falcidieno, the symposium became an annual event in 2001 after its merge with the Eurographics / ACM SIGGRAPH Workshop on Implicit Surfaces. The venue of the symposium rotates in turn among Asia, Europe and America.

== Overview ==
Since 2009, proceedings of SMI are published by Elsevier as a special issue of the Computers & Graphics journal. Proceedings until the year 2010 are available at DPLP, computer.org, and IEEE Explore.

== See also ==
- Symposium on Geometry Processing
- SIGGRAPH
- Solid modeling
