= GraphiCon =

International Conference about computer graphic

GraphiCon is the largest International conference on computer graphics and computer vision in the countries of the former Soviet Union. Established in 1991.

The conference is hosted by Moscow State University in association with Keldysh Institute of Applied Mathematics, Russian Center of Computing for Physics and Technology, and the Russian Computer Graphics Society. The Conference is held in close cooperation with Eurographics Association.

== Conference topics ==
The main topics of the conference include (this list is not exhaustive):

- Graphics and multimedia:
  - Geometry modeling and processing
  - Photorealistic rendering techniques
  - Scientific visualization
  - Image-based techniques
  - Computer graphics for mobile devices
  - Computer graphics hardware
  - Graphics in computer games
  - Animation and simulation
  - Virtual and augmented reality
- Image and video processing:
  - Medical image processing
  - Early vision and image representation
  - Tracking and surveillance
  - Segmentation and grouping
  - Image enhancement, restoration and super-resolution
- Computer vision:
  - 3D reconstruction and acquisition
  - Object localization and recognition
  - Multi-sensor fusion and 3D registration
  - Structure from motion and stereo
  - Scene modeling
  - Statistical methods and learning
- Applications

== Format ==
The following sections are organized for the event:

- Young scientists school courses and master classes
- Full paper presentations
- Work in progress presentations
- STAR reports
- Invited talks
- Industrial presentations
- Multimedia shows
- Round table discussions

== Specific GraphiCon conferences ==
Year	Location	Links	Notes
1998	Moscow	website, papers	
1999	Moscow	website, papers	
2000	Moscow	website, papers	
2001	Nizhny Novgorod	website, papers	
2002	Nizhny Novgorod	website, papers	
2003	Moscow	website, papers	
2004	Moscow	website, papers	
2005	Novosibirsk	website, papers	
2006	Novosibirsk	website, papers	
2007	Moscow	website, papers	
2008	Moscow	website, papers	
2009	Moscow	website, papers	
2010	Saint-Petersburg	website, papers	
2011	Moscow	website, papers	
2012	Moscow	website, papers	
2013	Vladivostok	website, papers	
2014	Rostov-on-Don	website, papers	
2015	Protvino, Moscow region	website, papers	
2016	Nizhny Novgorod	website, papers	
2017	Perm	website	

== See also ==
- Eurographics – the biggest conference on computer graphics in Europe
- SIGGRAPH – the world biggest conference on computer graphics
- List of computer science conferences#Computer_graphics
