= Geometric design =

Branch of computational geometry

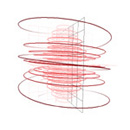
3D curves — Example 01

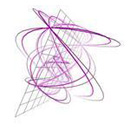
3D curves — Example 02

Geometrical design (GD) is a branch of computational geometry. It deals with the construction and representation of free-form curves, surfaces, or volumes and is closely related to geometric modeling. Core problems are curve and surface modelling and representation. GD studies especially the construction and manipulation of curves and surfaces given by a set of points using polynomial, rational, piecewise polynomial, or piecewise rational methods. The most important instruments here are parametric curves and parametric surfaces, such as Bézier curves, spline curves and surfaces. An important non-parametric approach is the level-set method.

Application areas include shipbuilding, aircraft, and automotive industries, as well as architectural design. The modern ubiquity and power of computers means that even perfume bottles and shampoo dispensers are designed using techniques unheard of by shipbuilders of 1960s.

Geometric models can be built for objects of any dimension in any geometric space. Both 2D and 3D geometric models are extensively used in computer graphics. 2D models are important in computer typography and technical drawing. 3D models are central to computer-aided design and manufacturing, and many applied technical fields such as geology and medical image processing.

Geometric models are usually distinguished from procedural and object-oriented models, which define the shape implicitly by an algorithm. They are also contrasted with digital images and volumetric models; and with mathematical models such as the zero set of an arbitrary polynomial. However, the distinction is often blurred: for instance, geometric shapes can be represented by objects; a digital image can be interpreted as a collection of colored squares; and geometric shapes such as circles are defined by implicit mathematical equations. Also, the modeling of fractal objects often requires a combination of geometric and procedural techniques.

Geometric problems originating in architecture can lead to interesting research and results in geometry processing, computer-aided geometric design, and discrete differential geometry.

In architecture, geometric design is associated with the pioneering explorations of Chuck Hoberman into transformational geometry as a design idiom, and applications of this design idiom within the domain of architectural geometry.

== See also ==

- Architectural geometry
- Computational topology
- CAD/CAM/CAE
- Digital geometry
- Geometric design of roads
- List of interactive geometry software
- Parametric curves
- Parametric surfaces
- Solid modeling
- Space partitioning
- Progressive-iterative approximation method
