= Olga Sorkine-Hornung =

Computer scientist

- אולגה סורקין-הורנונג
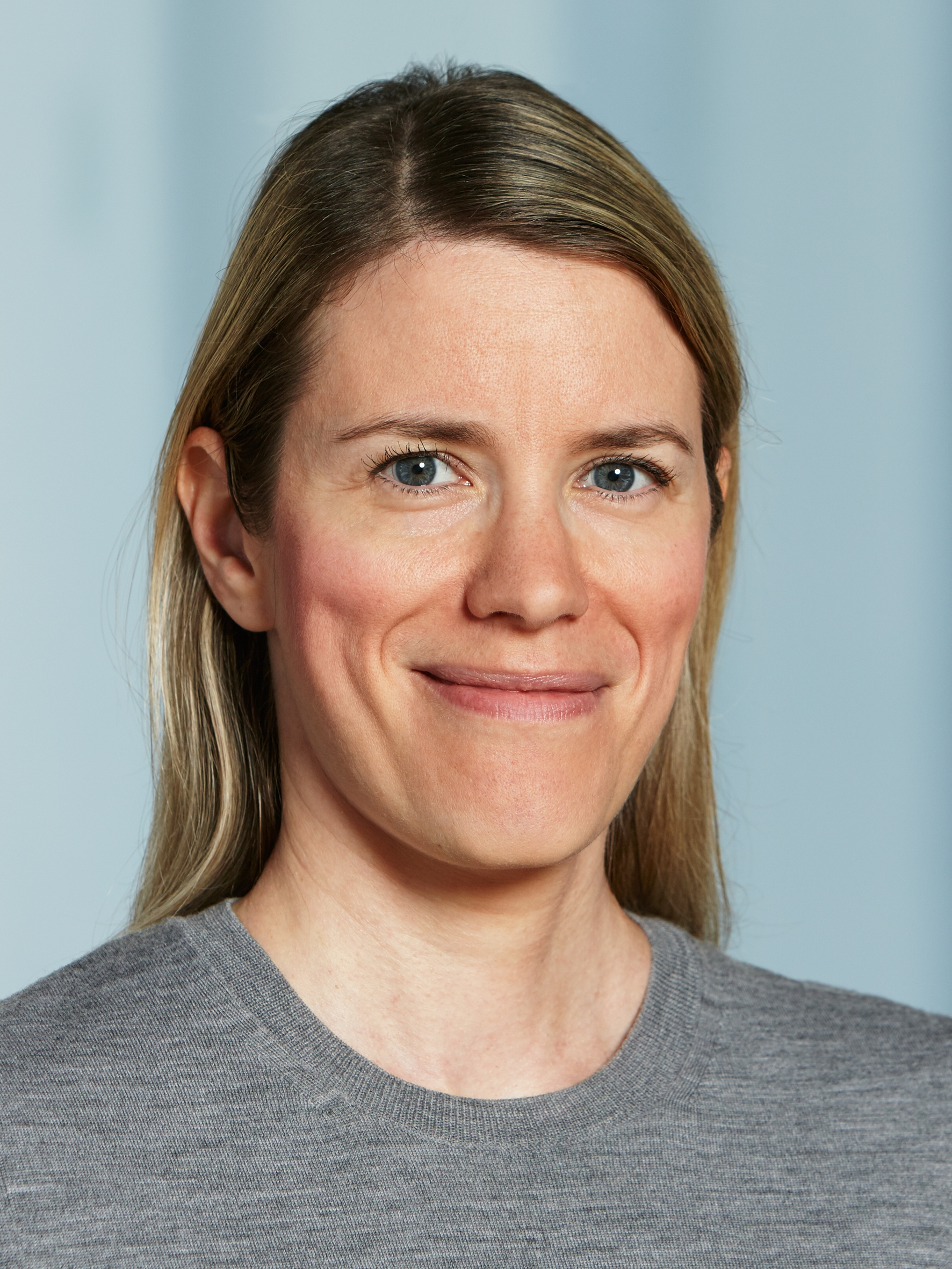
- Olga Sorkine, 2019
- Born: Olga Sorkine; 1981 (age 44–45); Moscow, RSFSR, Soviet Union
- Education: Tel Aviv University (B.A., M.S. and Ph.D.)
- Alma mater: Tel Aviv University
- Scientific career
- Fields: Computer graphics, geometric modeling, geometry processing
- Workplaces: ETH Zurich
- Thesis: Laplacian Mesh Processing (2006)
- Doctoral advisor: Daniel Cohen-Or
- Website: igl.ethz.ch

Olga Sorkine-Hornung (Hebrew: אולגה סורקין-הורנונג, Russian: Ольга Соркин-Хорнунг; born 1981) is a professor of Computer Science at ETH Zurich working in the fields of computer graphics, geometric modeling and geometry processing. She has received multiple awards, including the ACM SIGGRAPH Significant New Researcher Award in 2011.

== Personal life and career ==
Sorkine-Hornung was born in 1981 in the Soviet Union to a mother who is a mathematician and a Jewish father who is a physicist. They emigrated to Israel when she was twelve. She learnt the QBasic programming language when she was 13. She then studied math and computer science at Tel Aviv University graduating at the age of 19. She did her master's degree in parallel to her two-year military service, and completed her doctorate degree in 2006. Subsequently, she worked at Technische Universität Berlin as a postdoctoral researcher and as an assistant professor at the Courant Institute of Mathematical Sciences, before being appointed to ETH Zurich in 2011 at the age of 30 as the youngest professor at the time, where she leads the Interactive Geometry Lab. Since 2018, Sorkine-Hornung is a full professor of Computer Science at ETH Zurich.

She is married to a computer scientist, and in 2015 they became parents of twins.

== Awards ==
- 2024: Test of Time Award at the Eurographics Symposium on Geometry Processing
- 2024: Test of Time Award at SIGGRAPH 2024
- 2023: Elected as member of the Swiss Academy of Engineering Sciences (SATW)
- 2022: Test of Time Award at the Eurographics Symposium on Geometry Processing
- 2021: Golden Owl (awarded for excellence in teaching at ETH Zurich)
- 2020: Fellow of the Association for Computing Machinery (ACM)
- 2017: Rössler Prize (accompanied by CHF 200,000 in research funds)
- 2017: Eurographics Outstanding Technical Contributions Award
- 2016: Best Paper Award at the International Conference on 3D Vision (3DV) 2016
- 2015: Symposium on Geometry Processing Software Award for libigl, a C++ geometry processing library
- 2015: Fellow of the Eurographics Associationlibrary
- 2014: Best Paper Award at Eurographics Symposium on Geometry Processing 2014
- 2013: Intel Early Career Faculty Award
- 2012: ERC Starting Grant
- 2012: Latsis Prize of ETH Zurich
- 2011: ACM SIGGRAPH Significant New Researcher Award
- 2008: EUROGRAPHICS Young Researcher Award
- 2006-2008: Alexander von Humboldt research fellowship
- 2003: Excellence award, School of Computer Science, Tel Aviv University
- 1999-2000: Dean’s List of Excellence, Raymond and Beverly Sackler Faculty of Exact Sciences, Tel Aviv University
