= Bianca Falcidieno =

Italian applied mathematician

Bianca Falcidieno is an Italian applied mathematician whose research interests include computer graphics, geometric modeling, shape analysis, and mesh generation; she has been called a pioneer of semantics-driven shape representation. She is retired as a research director for the Italian National Research Council (CNR), where she led the Shape Modeling Group of the Institute for Applied Mathematics and Information Technologies (IMATI).

== Education and career ==
As a master's student, after earning a degree in mathematics in the 1970s, Falcidieno became interested in computer graphics and geometric modeling through a project to visualize mathematical functions for use in teaching mathematical analysis to engineering students. By 1981, she was a permanent researcher for CNR, and founded its first research center for computer graphics.

In the 1990s, with Japanese researcher Tosiyasu Kunii, she helped found both the Shape Modeling International conference and the associated journal, the International Journal of Shape Modeling, for which she was editor-in-chief.

== Recognition ==
In 2021, Falcidieno became the inaugural winner of the Shape Modeling International Tosiyasu Kunii Achievement Award, given "for her outstanding career achievements in shape modelling research". She is also a Eurographics Fellow and 2019 Eurographics Gold Medalist, and a Pioneer of the Solid Modeling Association.
