= Ron Goldman (mathematician) =

American mathematician and computer scientist

Ronald Neil Goldman is a professor of Computer Science at Rice University in Houston, Texas. Professor Goldman received his B.S. in mathematics from the Massachusetts Institute of Technology in 1968 and his M.A. and Ph.D. in mathematics from Johns Hopkins University in 1973.

Goldman's current research interests lie in the mathematical representation, manipulation, and analysis of shape using computers. His work includes research in computer-aided geometric design, solid modeling, computer graphics, and splines. He is particularly interested in algorithms for polynomial and piecewise polynomial curves and surfaces, and he is currently investigating applications of algebraic and differential geometry to geometric modeling. He has published over a hundred articles in journals, books, and conference proceedings on these and related topics.

Before returning to academia, Goldman worked for 10 years in industry solving problems in computer graphics, geometric modeling, and computer aided design. He served as a mathematician at Manufacturing Data Systems Inc., where he helped to implement one of the first industrial solid modeling systems. Later he worked as a senior design engineer at Ford Motor Company, enhancing the capabilities of their corporate graphics and computer-aided design software. From Ford he moved on to Control Data Corporation, where he was a principal consultant for the development group devoted to computer-aided design and manufacture. His responsibilities included database design, algorithms, education, acquisitions, and research.

Goldman left Control Data Corporation in 1987 to become an associate professor of computer science at the University of Waterloo in Ontario, Canada. He joined the faculty at Rice University in Houston, Texas as a professor of computer science in July 1990.

== Selected publications ==
- Goldman, Ron (2002). Pyramid Algorithms: A Dynamic Programming Approach to Curves and Surfaces for Geometric Modeling. Morgan Kaufmann. ISBN 9781558603547.
- Goldman, Ron (2009). An Integrated Introduction to Computer Graphics and Geometric Modeling. CRC Press. ISBN 9781439803349.
