= MeshInspector =

3D mesh processing software

- Original author: MeshInspector
- Developer: MeshInspector
- Release: 2022; 4 years ago
- Stable release: 2.5.7 / February 19, 2026; 4 months ago
- Written in: C++, Python
- Engine: MeshLib SDK
- Operating system: Windows, macOS (Apple Silicon and Intel), Linux, Web browser
- Size: 23.1-99.2 MB (varies by operating system)
- Type: 3D modelling software, 3D computer graphics
- License: Proprietary commercial software (subscription-based, free plan available)
- Website: meshinspector.com

MeshInspector is a cross-platform mesh editor and repair software that supports 3D printing preparation, scan-to-mesh, and quality control workflows. It operates based on the proprietary MeshLib library. Its scope includes polygonal meshes, point clouds, volumetric datasets, polylines, and distance maps. MeshInspector is available as a browser version and a standalone desktop application for Windows, macOS, and Linux.

== History ==
MeshInspector is developed and maintained by a software company whose team has been working in 3D mesh processing and inspection since 2007. It was initially focused on custom geometry processing and specialized 3D software for various dental tasks.

MeshInspector was commercially released in 2022 as an application for viewing, analyzing, editing, and converting 2D and 3D datasets. Further evolution prioritized expanding supported file formats, stabilizing core geometry operations, and improving performance in terms of working with large meshes, volumetric datasets, point clouds, and distance maps.

MeshInspector, over its releases, added support for large-format point clouds and expanded its point-cloud workflows. The 2025 releases incrementally introduced advanced navigation aids, redesigned tools for inspection and editing, broader file format handling, and productivity features, like grids and patterned duplication across both desktop and web.

The MeshInspector application is used for inspection and processing of 3D mesh and point-cloud data in engineering, manufacturing, additive manufacturing, medical imaging, geospatial applications, and research contexts.

== File formats and features ==
MeshInspector supports 2D and 3D data types, which include 3D surface models, sets of spatial points captured from real-world objects, voxel and volumetric datasets, polylines, distance maps, and G-Code. These file types can be opened, viewed, edited, analyzed, and converted either through the desktop application on supported operating systems or via a web-based interface accessible in a browser.

Users can inspect, analyze, modify, repair, and optimize 2D and 3D data using a set of built-in tools designed for working with meshes, point clouds, distance maps, volumetric datasets, and polylines across technical and medical workflows.

== License ==
MeshInspector is distributed under a proprietary commercial license by AMV Consulting. The application is provided under a term-based and non-exclusive license. The software is not open source, is not OSI-approved, and does not use an SPDX license identifier.
