= Joaquim Jorge =

Joaquim Jorge may refer to:

- Joaquim Jorge (footballer) (born 1939), Portuguese footballer
- Joaquim Jorge (computer scientist) (born 1959), Portuguese computer scientist and professor
