= International Journal of Shape Modeling =

- Discipline: Computer Science, Engineering, Mathematics
- Language: English
- Edited by: Bianca Falcidieno

Publication details
- History: 1994-present
- Publisher: World Scientific (Singapore)

Standard abbreviations
- ISO 4: Int. J. Shape Model.

Indexing
- ISSN: 0218-6543 (print); 1793-639X (web)

Links
- Journal homepage

The International Journal of Shape Modeling covers theories and techniques with regard to handling the shape of objects, focusing on disciplines, roles, and applications. Shape modeling should be intended both in a creative and an analytical sense. This includes articles on shape characteristics, as well as mathematical theory in differential geometry and the like. The multi-disciplinary journal was published by World Scientific until 2010.

== Abstracting and indexing ==
The journal is abstracted and indexed in Inspec, Zentralblatt MATH, and Compendex.
