= EuroVis =

- Abbreviation: EuroVis
- Discipline: Information visualization; Scientific visualization; Visual analytics

Publication details
- Publisher: Eurographics, IEEE Computer Society
- History: 1990-present
- Frequency: Annual
- Website: www.eurovis.org

The EuroVis Conference (EuroVis) is an annual conference on information visualization, scientific visualization, and visual analytics sponsored by the IEEE Computer Society Technical Committee on Visualization and Graphics. and organized by Eurographics. It is one of the three primary venues dedicated for visualization research, together with the VIS conference and the PacificVis conference, and considered leading together with the VIS, while also competing with computer graphics conferences like SIGGRAPH and Conference on Human Factors in Computing Systems.

As ranked by Google Scholar's h-index metric in 2025, EuroVis is the second highest rated venue for visualization research and the third-highest rated conference for computer graphics over all.

== History ==
The conference was initially established in 1990 as the Eurographics Workshop on Visualization in Scientific Computing (EG ViSC). This early format served as a focused forum for researchers across Europe working on visualization techniques applied to scientific computing problems. Over the following years, the conference gained prominence as the visualization community grew. In 1999, the event transitioned into a symposium format and was rebranded as VisSym (Visualization Symposium). The inaugural VisSym was held in Vienna, Austria. In 2005, reflecting its expanding scope beyond scientific computing and its growing international reputation, the symposium transitioned to a conference format and renamed EuroVis. This change also marked its full establishment as the official European counterpart to the IEEE Visualization conference traditionally held in North America. Since then, EuroVis has continued to grow in both scale and impact, attracting researchers, practitioners, and industry professionals from around the world. It has become a premier venue for presenting state-of-the-art research in all areas of visualization, including theoretical foundations, novel visualization techniques, with a strong focus on applications in data-driven domains. In addition to its main paper track, the conference includes workshops, tutorials, panels, and keynote talks. Widely used and award-winning visual analytics application like VRVis's VisDome flood simulation system have been first presented at EuroVis.

== Location ==
The conference is typically held at the end of May or early June and typically rotates around various locations in Europe.

List of conferences:

- 2026: Nottingham, United Kingdom (planned)
- 2025: Luxembourg City, Luxembourg (June 2-6, planned)
- 2024: Odense, Denmark (May 27-31)
- 2023: Leipzig, Germany (June 12-16)
- 2022: Rome, Italy (June 13-17, hybrid)
- 2021: Zurich, Switzerland (June 14-18, online)
- 2020: Norrköping, Sweden (May 25–29, moved online)
- 2019: Porto, Portugal (June 3–7)
- 2018: Brno, Czech Republic (June 4–8)
- 2017: Barcelona, Spain (June 12–16)
- 2016: Groningen, Netherlands (June 6–10)
- 2015: Cagliari, Italy (May 25–29)
- (United Kingdom) 2014: Swansea, Wales (June 9–13)
- 2013: Leipzig, Germany (June 17–21)
- 2012: Vienna, Austria (June 5–8)
- 2011: Bergen, Norway (May 31 – June 3)
- 2010: Bordeaux, France (June 9–11)
- 2009: Berlin, Germany (June 10–12)
- 2008: Eindhoven, Netherlands (May 26–28)
- 2007: Norrköping, Sweden (May 23–28)
- 2006: Lisbon, Portugal (May 8–10)
- 2005: Leeds, United Kingdom (June 1–3)
- 2004: Konstanz, Germany (May 19–21)
- 2003: Grenoble, France (May 26–28)
- 2002: Barcelona, Spain (May 27–29)
- 2001: Ascona, Switzerland (May 28–30)
- 2000: Amsterdam, Netherlands (May 29–31)
- 1999: Vienna, Austria (May 26–28)
- 1998: Blaubeuren, Germany (April 20–22)
- 1997: Boulogne-sur-Mer, France (April 28–30)
- 1996: Prague, Czech Republic (April 23–25)
- 1995: Chia, Italy (May 3–5)
- 1994: Rostock, Germany (May 30 – June 1)
- 1993: Abingdon, United Kingdom (April 21–23)
- 1992: Viareggio, Italy (April 27–29)
- 1991: Delft, Netherlands (April 22–24)
- 1990: Clamart, France (April 23–24)
