= Surface fairing =

In mathematics, Surface fairing is an aspect of mesh smoothing. The goal of surface fairing is to compute shapes that are as smooth as possible.

On an abstract level, mesh smoothing is concerned with the design and computation of smooth functions $f : S \rightarrow \R^d$ on a triangle mesh. Mesh fairing does not just slightly smooth the function $f$ in order to remove the high frequency noise. It also smooths the function as much as possible in order to obtain, e.g., an as-smooth-as-possible surface patch or an as-smooth-as-possible shape deformation.

How to actually measure smoothness or fairness obviously depends on the application, but in general fair surfaces should follow the principle of simplest shape: the surface should be free of any unnecessary details or oscillations. This can be modeled by a suitable energy that penalizes unaesthetic behavior of the surface. A minimization of this fairness energy—subject to user-defined constraints—eventually yields the desired shape. Example applications include the construction of smooth blend surfaces and hole filling by smooth patches.
