= Computers & Graphics =

Peer-reviewed scientific journal

- Discipline: Computer graphics
- Language: English
- Edited by: Joaquim Jorge

Publication details
- Former names: Computers & Graphics - UK
- History: 1975–present
- Publisher: Elsevier
- Frequency: 8/year
- Open access: Hybrid
- Impact factor: 2.7 (2025)

Standard abbreviations
- ISO 4: Comput. Graph.

Indexing
- ISSN: 0097-8493 (print); 1873-7684 (web)
- LCCN: 75646616
- OCLC no.: 888517496

Links
- Journal homepage; Online archive

Computers & Graphics is a peer-reviewed scientific journal that covers computer graphics and related subjects such as data visualization, human-computer interaction, virtual reality, and augmented reality. It was established in 1975 and originally published by Pergamon Press. It is now published by Elsevier, which acquired Pergamon Press in 1991. From 2018 to 2022 Graphics and Visual Computing was an open access sister journal sharing the same editorial team and double-blind peer-review policies. It has since merged into GMOD, the International Journal of Graphical Models.

== History ==
The journal was established in 1975 by founding editor-in-chief Robert Schiffman (University of Colorado, Boulder), as Computers & Graphics-UK. Schiffman, who co-organized the first SIGGRAPH conference in 1974, had the conference proceedings published as the first issue of the journal. He was succeeded in 1978 by Larry Feeser (Rensselaer Polytechnic Institute). In 1983 José Luis Encarnação (Technische Hochschule Darmstadt) took over. Joaquim Jorge (University of Lisbon) has been Editor-in-Chief since 2007.

== Replicability ==
The journal is working with the Graphics Replicability Stamp Initiative to promote replicable results in publication.

== Abstracting and indexing ==
The journal is abstracted and indexed in:

- Current Contents/Engineering, Computing & Technology
- EBSCO databases
- Ei Compendex
- Inspec
- ProQuest databases
- Science Citation Index Expanded
- Scopus
- Chinese Computer Federation/Recommended List of International Conferences and Journals on CAD & Graphics and Multimedia.

According to the Journal Citation Reports, the journal has a 2025 impact factor of 2.7. Scopus reports a 4-year CiteScore of 6.2 (2025)
