= Architectural geometry =

Area of research

Architectural geometry is an area of research which combines applied geometry and architecture, which looks at the design, analysis and manufacture processes. It lies at the core of architectural design and strongly challenges contemporary practice, the so-called architectural practice of the digital age.

Architectural geometry is influenced by following fields: differential geometry, topology, fractal geometry, and cellular automata.

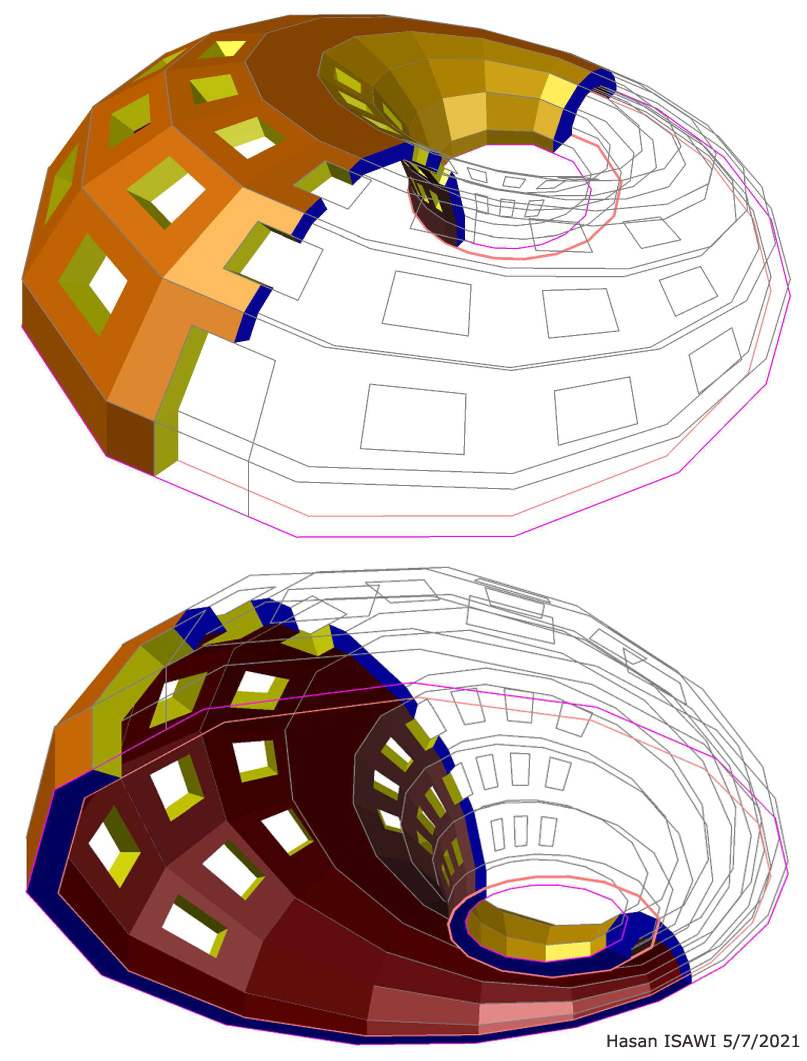
polyhedral approximation of a cyclide-offset.

Topics include:

- freeform curves and surfaces creation
- developable surfaces
- discretisation
- generative design
- digital prototyping and manufacturing

== See also ==
- Geometric design
- Computer-aided architectural design
- Mathematics and architecture
- Fractal geometry
- Blobitecture
