= 2D geometric model =

2-dimensional model of an object

A 2D geometric model is a geometric model of an object as a two-dimensional figure, usually on the Euclidean or Cartesian plane.

Even though all material objects are three-dimensional, a 2D geometric model is often adequate for certain flat objects, such as paper cut-outs and machine parts made of sheet metal. Other examples include circles used as a model of thunderstorms, which can be considered flat when viewed from above.

2D geometric models are also convenient for describing certain types of artificial images, such as technical diagrams, logos, the glyphs of a font, etc. They are an essential tool of 2D computer graphics and often used as components of 3D geometric models, e.g. to describe the decals to be applied to a car model. Modern architecture practice "digital rendering" which is a technique used to form a perception of a 2-D geometric model as of a 3-D geometric model designed through descriptive geometry and computerized equipment.

== 2D geometric modeling techniques ==
- simple geometric shapes
- boundary representation
- Boolean operations on polygons

== See also ==
- 2D geometric primitive
- Computational geometry
- Digital image
