= Symposium on Geometry Processing =

Symposium on Geometry Processing (SGP) is an annual symposium hosted by the European Association For Computer Graphics (Eurographics). The goal of the symposium is to present and discuss new research ideas and results in geometry processing. The conference is geared toward the discussion of mathematical foundations and practical algorithms for the processing of complex geometric data sets, ranging from acquisition and editing all the way to animation, transmission and display. As such, it draws on many disciplines spanning pure and applied mathematics, computer science, and engineering. The proceedings of SGP appear as a special issue of the Computer Graphics Forum, the International Journal of the Eurographics Association. Since 2011, SGP has held a two-day "graduate school" preceding the conference, typically composed of workshop-style courses from subfield experts.

== Venues ==
| Year | Location | Links | Date | Submitted | Accepted | Rate |
|---|---|---|---|---|---|---|
| 2027 | Singapore | Webpage | 21-25 Jun | | | |
| 2026 | Bern, Switzerland | Webpage | 1-3 Jul | 12 + 84 | 22 | 22% |
| 2025 | Bilbao, Spain | Webpage | 2-4 Jul | 19 + 52 | 26 | 36% |
| 2024 | Cambridge, MA, USA | Webpage | 24-26 Jun | | | |
| 2023 | Genova, Italy | Webpage | 1-2 Jul | | | |
| 2022 | Virtual | Webpage | 2-3 Jul | | | |
| 2021 | Toronto, Canada (Virtual) | Webpage | 12-14 Jul | | | |
| 2020 | Utrecht, The Netherlands (Virtual) | Webpage Papers | 6-8 Jul | 59 | 21 | 36% |
| 2019 | Milan, Italy | Webpage Papers | 8-10 Jul | 49 | 15 | 30% |
| 2018 | Paris, France | Webpage Papers | 9-11 Jul | 67 | 20 | 29% |
| 2017 | London, UK | Webpage Papers | 1-5 Jul | 50 | 17 | 34% |
| 2016 | Berlin, Germany | Webpage Papers | 20-24 Jul | 81 | 26 | 32% |
| 2015 | Graz, Austria | Webpage Papers | 6-8 Jul | 72 | 22 | 31% |
| 2014 | Cardiff, UK | Webpage Papers | 9-11 Jul | 89 | 28 | 31% |
| 2013 | Genova, Italy | Webpage Papers | 3-5 Jul | 56 | 23 | 41% |
| 2012 | Tallinn, Estonia | Webpage Papers | 16-18 Jul | 72 | 25 | 35% |
| 2011 | Lausanne, Switzerland | Webpage Papers | 20-22 Jul | 77 | 23 | 30% |
| 2010 | Lyon, France | Webpage Papers | 5-7 Jul | 70 | 24 | 34% |
| 2009 | Berlin, Germany | Webpage Papers | 15-17 Jul | 75 | 26 | 35% |
| 2008 | Copenhagen, Denmark | Webpage Papers | 2-4 Jul | 96 | 23 | 24% |
| 2007 | Barcelona, Spain | Webpage Papers | 4-6 Jul | 74 | 21 | 28% |
| 2006 | Cagliari, Sardinia | Webpage Papers | 26-28 Jun | 79 | 21 | 27% |
| 2005 | Vienna, Austria | Webpage Papers | 4-6 Jul | 87 | 22 | 25% |
| 2004 | Nice, France | Webpage Papers | 8-10 Jul | 85 | 25 | 29% |
| 2003 | Aachen, Germany | Webpage Papers | 23-25 Jun | 72 | 25 | 35% |

== Best Paper Awards ==
Each year up to three papers are recognized with a Best Paper Award.

| Year | Author | Title |
|---|---|---|
| 2026 | Hongyi Liu, Oded Stein, Amir Vaxman, Mirela Ben-Chen, and Misha Kazhdan | Phong-Rodrigues Extrinsic Vector-Field Processing |
| 2026 | Ingmar Ludwig and Marcel Campen | Strictly Conservative Neural Distance Fields |
| 2026 | Alice Petrov, Mohammad Sina Nabizadeh, Ana Dodik, and Justin Solomon | Tangent Blow-Ups for Processing Non-Manifold Geometry |
| 2025 | Yousuf Soliman and Nicholas Sharp | The Affine Heat Method |
| 2025 | Kenji Tojo and Nobuyuki Umetani | GreenCloud: Volumetric Gradient Filtering via Regularized Green's Functions |
| 2025 | Xavier Chermain et al. | Atomizer: Beyond Non-Planar Slicing for Fused Filament Fabrication |
| 2024 | Guillaume Coiffier and Louis Bethune | 1-Lipschitz Neural Distance Fields |
| 2024 | Leonardo Sacht and Alec Jacobson | Cascading upper bounds for triangle soup Pompeiu-Hausdorff distance |
| 2024 | Hendrik Brückler et al. | Integer-Sheet-Pump Quantization for Hexahedral Meshing |
| 2023 | Maximilian Kohlbrenner et al. | Poisson Manifold Reconstruction - Beyond Co-dimension One |
| 2023 | Shir Rorberg et al. | BPM: Blended Piecewise Möbius Maps |
| 2023 | Olga Guțan et al. | Singularity-Free Frame Fields for Line Drawing Vectorization |
| 2022 | Patrick Schmidt et al. | TinyAD: Automatic Differentiation in Geometry Processing Made Simple |
| 2022 | Payam Khanteimouri et al. | Rational Bézier Guarding |
| 2022 | Jinlin Yang et al. | Precise High-order Meshing of 2D Domains with Rational Bézier Curves |
| 2021 | Janis Born et al. | Surface Map Homology Inference |
| 2021 | Philipp Trettner et al. | Geodesic Distance Computation via Virtual Source Propagation |
| 2021 | Eamon Whalen et al. | SimJEB: Simulated Jet Engine Bracket Dataset |
| 2020 | Marc Alexa et al. | Properties of Laplace Operators for Tetrahedral Meshes |
| 2020 | Nicholas Sharp and Keenan Crane | A Laplacian for Nonmanifold Triangle Meshes |
| 2020 | Xuan Tang et al. | EGGS: Sparsity-Specific Code Generation |
| 2019 | Zhipel Yan and Scott Schaefer | A Family of Barycentric Coordinates for Co-Dimension 1 Manifolds with Simplicial Facets |
| 2019 | Meged Shoham et al. | Hierarchical Functional Maps between Subdivision Surfaces |
| 2018 | Zi Ye et al. | A unified discrete framework for intrinsic and extrinsic Dirac operators for geometry processing |
| 2018 | Jingwei Huang et al. | QuadFlow: A Scalable and Robust Method for Quadrangulation |
| 2018 | Marc Comino et al. | Sensor-aware Normal Estimation for Range Scan Point Clouds |
| 2017 | Hamid Laga and Hedi Tabia | Modeling and Exploring Co-Variations in the Geometry and Configuration of Man-made 3D Shape Families |
| 2017 | Max Budninskiy et al. | Spectral Affine-Kernel Embeddings |
| 2017 | Sebastian Claici et al. | Isometry-Aware Preconditioning for Mesh Parameterization |
| 2016 | Behrend Heeren et al. | Splines in the Space of Shells |
| 2016 | Or Litany et al. | Non-Rigid Puzzles |
| 2016 | Zeyun Shi et al. | Symmetry and Orbit Detection via Lie-Algebra Voting |
| 2015 | Itay Kezurer et al. | Tight Relaxation of Quadratic Matching |
| 2015 | Andrea Tagliasacchi et al. | Robust Articulated-ICP for Real-Time Hand Tracking |
| 2014 | Olga Diamanti et al. | Designing N-PolyVector Fields with Complex Polynomials |
| 2014 | Nicolas Mellado et al. | Super 4PCS: Fast Global Pointcloud Registration via Smart Indexing |
| 2013 | Qixing Huang and Leonidas Guibas | Consistent Shape Maps via Semidefinite Programming |
| 2013 | Simon Giraudot et al. | Noise-Adaptive Shape Reconstruction from Raw Point Sets |
| 2013 | Marcel Campen et al. | Practical Anisotropic Geodesy |
| 2012 | Ofir Weber et al. | Computing Extremal Quasiconformal Maps |
| 2012 | Amir Vaxman | Modeling Polyhedral Meshes with Affine Maps |
| 2012 | Maik Schulze et al. | Stream Surface Parametrization by Flow-Orthogonal Front Lines |
| 2011 | Klaus Hildebrandt and Konrad Polthier | On approximation of the Laplace–Beltrami operator and the Willmore energy of surfaces |
| 2011 | Ofir Weber et al. | A Complex View of Barycentric Mappings |
| 2011 | Raif M. Rustamov | Multiscale Biharmonic Kernels |
| 2010 | Keenan Crane et al. | Trivial Connections on Discrete Surfaces |
| 2010 | Mirela Ben-Chen et al. | On Discrete Killing Vector Fields and Patterns on Surfaces |
| 2010 | Marcel Campen and Leif Kobbelt | Polygonal Boundary Evaluation of Minkowski Sums and Swept Volumes |
| 2009 | Jian Sun et al. | A Concise and Provably Informative Multi-scale Signature Based on Heat Diffusion |
| 2009 | Fatemeh Abbasinejad et al. | Rotating Scans for Systematic Error Removal |
| 2009 | Ming Chuang et al. | Estimating the Laplace-Beltrami Operator by Restricting 3D Functions |
| 2008 | Ramsay Dyer et al. | Surface sampling and the intrinsic Voronoi diagram |
| 2008 | Sebastian Martin et al. | Polyhedral Finite Elements Using Harmonic Basis Functions (student paper) |
| 2008 | Maks Ovsjanikov et al. | Global Intrinsic Symmetries of Shapes (student paper) |
| 2007 | Pierre Alliez et al. | Voronoi-based Variational Reconstruction for Unoriented Point Sets |
| 2006 | Mario Botsch et al. | PriMo: Coupled Prisms for Intuitive Surface Modeling |

== SGP Software Award ==
Each year, since 2011, SGP also awards a prize for the best freely available software related to or useful for geometry processing.

| Year | Author | Title |
|---|---|---|
| 2026 | Ahmed H. Mahmoud, Serban D. Porumbescu, John D. Owens | RXMesh |
| 2025 | Silvia Sellan and Oded Stein, and other contributors | GPyToolbox |
| 2024 | Marco Livesu | Cinolib |
| 2023 | Bruno Lévy | Geogram |
| 2022 | Nicholas Sharp | Polyscope |
| 2021 | Amir Vaxman | Directional |
| 2020 | Wenzel Jakob et al. | Instant Meshes |
| 2019 | Rohan Sawhney and Keenan Crane | Boundary First Flattening |
| 2018 | Tyson Brochu and Robert Bridson | El Topo |
| 2017 | Nicolas Mellado, Dror Aiger, Niloy J. Mitra | Super4PCS |
| 2017 | Paolo Cignoni | MeshLab |
| 2016 | David Coeurjolly, Jacques-Olivier Lachaud et al. | DGtal |
| 2015 | Alec Jacobson, Daniele Panozzo, Olga Diamanti et al. | libigl |
| 2014 | Marco Attene | MeshFix |
| 2013 | Benoît Jacob and Gael Guennebaud | Eigen |
| 2012 | Hang Si | TetGen |
| 2011 | Michael Kazhdan and Matthew Bolitho | Poisson Surface Reconstruction |

== SGP Test of Time Award ==
Each year, since 2021, SGP has given a Test of Time award to a paper published at least ten years prior that continues to be impactful for both research and practice in geometry processing.

| Year | Author | Title | Year of Publication |
|---|---|---|---|
| 2026 | Raif M. Rustamov | Laplace-Beltrami Eigenfunctions for Deformation Invariant Shape Representation | 2007 |
| 2025 | Sun Jian et al. | A concise and provably informative multi‐scale signature based on heat diffusion | 2009 |
| 2024 | Olga Sorkine-Hornung et al. | Laplacian Surface Editing | 2004 |
| 2023 | Max Wardetzky et al. | Discrete Laplace operators: No Free Lunch | 2007 |
| 2022 | Olga Sorkine-Hornung and Marc Alexa | As-Rigid-As-Possible Surface Modeling | 2007 |
| 2021 | Michael Kazhdan et al. | Poisson Surface Reconstruction | 2006 |

== SGP Dataset Award ==
Each year, since 2016, SGP also awards a prize for the best freely available dataset related to or useful for geometry processing. The last such award was given in 2021.

| Year | Author | Title |
|---|---|---|
| 2021 | Matteo Bracci, Marco Tarini, Nico Pietroni, Marco Livesu, Paolo Cignoni | HexaLab |
| 2020 | Angela Dai, Angel X. Chang, Manolis Savva, Maciej Halber, Thomas Funkhouser, Matthias Nießner | ScanNet |
| 2019 | Sebastian Koch, Albert Matveev, Zhongshi Jiang, Francis Williams, Alexey Artemov, Evgeny Burnaev, Marc Alexa, Denis Zorin, Daniele Panozzo | ABC Dataset |
| 2018 | Angel X. Chang, Thomas Funkhouser, Leonidas Guibas, Pat Hanrahan, Qixing Huang, Zimo Li, Silvio Savarese, Manolis Savva, Shuran Song, Hao Su, Jianxiong Xiao, Li Yi, and Fisher Yu | ShapeNet |
| 2017 | Qingnan Zhou, Alec Jacobson | Thingi10k |
| 2016 | Federica Bogo, Javier Romero, Matthew Loper, Michael J. Black | FAUST |
