= IEEE VR =

Annual IEEE conference on virtual reality

IEEE Conference on Virtual Reality and 3D User Interfaces
- Abbreviation: IEEE VR
- Discipline: Virtual reality, Mixed reality, Human–computer interaction, 3D user interfaces

Publication details
- History: 1993–present (as VRAIS 1993–1998; IEEE VR 1999– )
- Frequency: Annual
- Website: ieeevr.org

The IEEE Conference on Virtual Reality and 3D User Interfaces (IEEE VR) is an annual international research conference covering virtual reality (VR), augmented reality (AR), mixed reality (MR), and 3D user interfaces. In 2018, the long-running IEEE VR conference and the IEEE Symposium on 3D User Interfaces (3DUI) were merged into a single event under the short name IEEE VR. The conference is sponsored by the IEEE Computer Society and the IEEE Visualization and Graphics Technical Community (VGTC).

== History ==
IEEE VR traces its origins to the Virtual Reality Annual International Symposium (VRAIS), first held in Seattle, Washington, in September 1993 and subsequently in North America during the 1990s. From 1999 the event series continued as IEEE Virtual Reality (IEEE VR), with venues rotating across Asia, Europe and North America.

The standalone IEEE Symposium on 3D User Interfaces (3DUI) began as a workshop at IEEE VR in 2004 and grew into a premier venue on 3D interaction. In 2018, IEEE VR and 3DUI were merged into the unified IEEE Conference on Virtual Reality and 3D User Interfaces.
