= MeshLib =

3D mesh processing software

- Developer: MeshInspector
- Stable release: 3.0.8.228
- Written in: C++ (with bindings to Python, C, C#)
- Operating system: Windows, macOS, Linux, WebAssembly
- Type: 3D geometry processing SDK
- License: Free for non-commercial use; commercial licenses available

MeshLib is a cross-platform software development kit (SDK) for three-dimensional (3D) data processing, primarily implemented in C++. It provides tools for handling polygonal meshes, point clouds, and voxel-based data. The library includes functionality for geometry processing, computational analysis, and conversion between different 3D data formats. Bindings are available for Python (fully exposed starting from version 3.0.0.) and C# (not fully exposed), with a C API fully exposed since v3.0.7.

== Overview ==
MeshInspector was co-founded by Alexey Vishnevskiy, an inventor on multiple patents in the fields of CAD/CAM and digital dentistry, and Sergey Nikolskiy, an inventor and co-author of patents related to digital dentistry, 3D modeling, and segmentation technologies. Vishnevskiy, Nikolskiy and the team hold more than 30 patents and scientific publications in areas connected to 3D modeling, mesh processing, and dental CAD/CAM technologies.

Vishnevskiy and Nikolskiy have long-term experience in CAD/CAM software development and 3D mesh processing. They began working together in the 2000s on projects in dental technology, which later developed into MeshInspector and the development MeshLib library. The group began developing MeshLib in the early 2020s alongside the MeshInspector application.

MeshLib was first launched commercially in 2022. The most recent major version, the 3.0.x series was introduced in October 2024 and has continued to receive iterative updates through 2025. MeshLib supports several functions for 3D data, including Mesh generation, mesh repair, boolean operations on both voxels and meshes, mesh simplification, mesh offsetting, delaunay triangulation, iterative closest point (ICP), collision detection and distance computation, mesh smoothing, point cloud to mesh and triangulation, and supports over 25 file formats across meshes, point clouds, voxels, polylines, distance maps and G-Code. MeshLib can also be built for WebAssembly via Emscripten.

=== Data structures ===
The MeshLib SDK manages 3D data via dedicated structures. Surface geometry is stored in the core mesh object and acts as the main container for algorithms. Vertex positions are held in a dedicated array of points, i.e., 3D coordinates. Topology is represented by MeshTopology, a half-edge structure that provides face/edge/vertex connectivity and ensures manifold compliance. For spatial queries and collision detection, MeshLib builds and caches an AABB-tree (axis-aligned bounding box hierarchy) over mesh triangles to accelerate broad-phase operations.

== License ==
The MeshLib SDK is distributed under its own dual-licensing model. It offers a free license for educational and research institutions under non-commercial terms, and requires a commercial license for business usage. The software is not released under any OSI-approved open-source license. Bundled assets are governed by the same licensing terms where specified.
