= Eurographics =

- European Association for Computer Graphics
- Formation: 1980
- Type: Professional association
- Legal status: Professional association
- Purpose: Computer graphics
- Region served: Europe
- Methods: Conferences, publications, fellowships
- Fields: Computer graphics, scientific visualization, human–computer interaction, multimedia
- Members: Researchers, educators, industrialists, and practitioners
- Website: www.eg.org

Eurographics is a Europe-wide professional computer graphics association founded in 1980. The association supports its members in advancing the state of the art in computer graphics and related fields such as multimedia, scientific visualization, and human–computer interaction.

== Overview ==
Eurographics organizes many events and services, which are open to everyone. Eurgraphics has a broad membership, including researchers & developers, educators & industrialists, users & providers of computer graphics hardware, software, and applications. Eurographics organizes venues including the Eurographics Symposium on Rendering and High-Performance Graphics. Eurographics publishes Computer Graphics Forum, a quarterly journal, among others.

== Conferences and symposiums ==
- Annual Conference
- 3D Object Retrieval
- Computer Animation
- EuroVis
- EXPRESSIVE
- Geometry Processing
- Graphics and Cultural Heritage
- High-Performance Graphics
- Intelligent Cinematography and Editing
- Material Appearance Modeling
- Parallel Graphics and Visualization
- Rendering (EGSR)
- Urban Data Modeling and Visualization
- Virtual Environments
- Visual Computing in Biology and Medicine

== Related organizations ==
- ACM SIGGRAPH hosts SIGGRAPH, the world's largest computer graphics conference.
- IEEE Visualization and Graphics Technical Committee (VGTC), which co-organizes events such as EuroVis and IEEE VR, and maintains close ties with Eurographics in visualization and XR research.
- ACM SIGGRAPH, which hosts the SIGGRAPH and SIGGRAPH Asia conferences.
- Russian Computer Graphics Society hosts Graphicon, the former Soviet Union's largest computer graphics conference, in cooperation with Eurographics.
