= Geometric modeling =

Geometric modeling is a branch of applied mathematics and computational geometry that studies methods and algorithms for the mathematical description of shapes. The shapes studied in geometric modeling are mostly two- or three-dimensional (solid figures), although many of its tools and principles can be applied to sets of any finite dimension. Today most geometric modeling is done with computers and for computer-based applications. Two-dimensional models are important in computer typography and technical drawing. Three-dimensional models are central to computer-aided design and manufacturing (CAD/CAM), and widely used in many applied technical fields such as civil and mechanical engineering, architecture, geology and medical image processing.

Geometric models are usually distinguished from procedural and object-oriented models, which define the shape implicitly by an opaque algorithm that generates its appearance. They are also contrasted with digital images and volumetric models which represent the shape as a subset of a fine regular partition of space; and with fractal models that give an infinitely recursive definition of the shape. However, these distinctions are often blurred: for instance, a digital image can be interpreted as a collection of colored squares; and geometric shapes such as circles are defined by implicit mathematical equations. Also, a fractal model yields a parametric or implicit model when its recursive definition is truncated to a finite depth.

Notable awards of the area are the John A. Gregory Memorial Award and the Bézier award.

== See also ==
- 2D geometric modeling
- Architectural geometry
- Computational conformal geometry
- Computational topology
- Computer-aided engineering
- Computer-aided manufacturing
- Digital geometry
- Geometric modeling kernel
- List of interactive geometry software
- Parametric equation
- Parametric surface
- Solid modeling
- Space partitioning
