= Helmholtz reciprocity =

Principle in optics relating light rays and their reverse rays

The Helmholtz reciprocity principle describes how a ray of light and its reverse ray encounter matched optical adventures, such as reflections, refractions, and absorptions in a passive medium, or at an interface. It does not apply to moving, non-linear, or magnetic media.

For example, incoming and outgoing light can be considered as reversals of each other, without affecting the bidirectional reflectance distribution function (BRDF) outcome. If light was measured with a sensor and that light reflected on a material with a BRDF that obeys the Helmholtz reciprocity principle one would be able to swap the sensor and light source and the measurement of flux would remain equal.

In the computer graphics scheme of global illumination, the Helmholtz reciprocity principle is important if the global illumination algorithm reverses light paths (for example raytracing versus classic light path tracing).

== Physics ==
The Stokes–Helmholtz reversion–reciprocity principle was stated in part by Stokes (1849) and with reference to polarization on page 169 of Hermann Helmholtz's Handbuch der physiologischen Optik of 1856 as cited by Gustav Kirchhoff and by Max Planck.

As cited by Kirchhoff in 1860, the principle is translated as follows:

A ray of light proceeding from point 1 arrives at point 2 after suffering any number of refractions, reflections, &c. At point 1 let any two perpendicular planes a_{1}, b_{1} be taken in the direction of the ray; and let the vibrations of the ray be divided into two parts, one in each of these planes. Take similar planes a_{2}, b_{2} in the ray at point 2; then the following proposition may be demonstrated. If when the quantity of light i polarized in the plane a_{1} proceeds from 1 in the direction of the given ray, that part k thereof of light polarized in a_{2} arrives at 2, then, conversely, if the quantity of light i polarized in a_{2} proceeds from 2, the same quantity of light k polarized in a_{1} [Kirchhoff's published text here corrected by Wikipedia editor to agree with Helmholtz's 1867 text] will arrive at 1.

Simply put, in suitable conditions, the principle states that the source and observation point may be switched without changing the measured intensity. Intuitively, "If I can see you, you can see me." Like the principles of thermodynamics, in suitable conditions, this principle is reliable enough to use as a check on the correct performance of experiments, in contrast with the usual situation in which the experiments are tests of a proposed law.

In his magisterial proof of the validity of Kirchhoff's law of equality of radiative emissivity and absorptivity, Planck makes repeated and essential use of the Stokes–Helmholtz reciprocity principle. Rayleigh stated the basic idea of reciprocity as a consequence of the linearity of propagation of small vibrations, light consisting of sinusoidal vibrations in a linear medium.

When there are magnetic fields in the path of the ray, the principle does not apply. Departure of the optical medium from linearity also causes departure from Helmholtz reciprocity, as well as the presence of moving objects in the path of the ray.

Helmholtz reciprocity referred originally to light. This is a particular form of electromagnetism that may be called far-field radiation. For this, the electric and magnetic fields do not need distinct descriptions, because they propagate feeding each other evenly. So the Helmholtz principle is a more simply described special case of electromagnetic reciprocity in general, which is described by distinct accounts of the interacting electric and magnetic fields. The Helmholtz principle rests mainly on the linearity and superposability of the light field, and it has close analogues in non-electromagnetic linear propagating fields, such as sound. It was discovered before the electromagnetic nature of light became known.

The Helmholtz reciprocity theorem has been rigorously proven in a number of ways, generally making use of quantum mechanical time-reversal symmetry. As these more mathematically complicated proofs may detract from the simplicity of the theorem, A.P Pogany and P. S. Turner have proven it in only a few steps using a Born series. Assuming a light source at a point A and an observation point O, with various scattering points $r_1, r_2, ... r$ between them, the Schrödinger equation may be used to represent the resulting wave function in space:

$$(\bigtriangledown^2 + 4\pi K^2)\Psi(\mathbf{r,r_A})=-4\pi K^2V(\mathbf{r})\Psi(\mathbf{r,r_A})+\delta(\mathbf{r-r_A})$$

By applying a Green's function, the above equation can be solved for the wave function in an integral (and thus iterative) form:

$$\Psi(\mathbf{r,r_A})=G(\mathbf{r,r_A})-4\pi^2\int G(\mathbf{r,r'})V(\mathbf{r'})\Psi(\mathbf{r',r_A})d\mathbf{r'}$$

where

$$G(\mathbf{r,r'})=-\frac{\exp(2\pi iK|\mathbf{r-r'}|)}{|\mathbf{r-r'}|}$$.

Next, it is valid to assume the solution inside the scattering medium at point O may be approximated by a Born series, making use of the Born approximation in scattering theory. In doing so, the series may be iterated through in the usual way to generate the following integral solution:

$$\Psi(\mathbf{r_O,r_A})=G(\mathbf{r_O,r_A})-4\pi^2\int G(\mathbf{r_O,r_1})V(\mathbf{r_1})G(\mathbf{r_1,r_A})
d\mathbf{r_1}$$

$$+(-4\pi^2)^2\int d\mathbf{r_1}\int G(\mathbf{r_O,r_1})G(\mathbf{r_1,r_2})V(\mathbf{r_1})V(\mathbf{r_2})G(\mathbf{r_2,r_A})d\mathbf{r_2}$$

$$+ (-4\pi^2)^3\int d\mathbf{r_1}\int d\mathbf{r_2}\int G(\mathbf{r_O,r_1})G(\mathbf{r_1,r_2})G(\mathbf{r_2,r_3})V(\mathbf{r_1})V(\mathbf{r_2})V(\mathbf{r_3})G(\mathbf{r_3,r_A})d\mathbf{r_3}$$

$$+
...$$

Noting again the form of the Green's function, it is apparent that switching $\mathbf{r_A}$ and $\mathbf{r_O}$ in the above form will not change the result; that is to say, $\Psi(\mathbf{r_A,r_O})=\Psi(\mathbf{r_O,r_A})$, which is the mathematical statement of the reciprocity theorem: switching the light source A and observation point O does not alter the observed wave function.

== Applications ==
One simple yet important implication of this reciprocity principle is that any light directed through a lens in one direction (from object to image plane) is optically equal to its conjugate, i.e. light being directed through the same set-up but in the opposite direction. An electron being focused through any series of optical components does not “care” from which direction it comes; as long as the same optical events happen to it, the resulting wave function will be the same. For that reason, this principle has important applications in the field of transmission electron microscopy (TEM). The notion that conjugate optical processes produce equivalent results allows the microscope user to grasp a deeper understanding of, and have considerable flexibility in, techniques involving electron diffraction, Kikuchi patterns, dark-field images, and others.

An important caveat to note is that in a situation where electrons lose energy after interacting with the scattering medium of the sample, there is not time-reversal symmetry. Therefore, reciprocity only truly applies in situations of elastic scattering. In the case of inelastic scattering with small energy loss, it can be shown that reciprocity may be used to approximate intensity (rather than wave amplitude). So in very thick samples or samples in which inelastic scattering dominates, the benefits of using reciprocity for the previously mentioned TEM applications are no longer valid. Furthermore, it has been demonstrated experimentally that reciprocity does apply in a TEM under the right conditions, but the underlying physics of the principle dictates that reciprocity can only be truly exact if ray transmission occurs through only scalar fields, i.e. no magnetic fields. We can therefore conclude that the distortions to reciprocity due to magnetic fields of the electromagnetic lenses in TEM may be ignored under typical operating conditions. However, users should be careful not to apply reciprocity to magnetic imaging techniques, TEM of ferromagnetic materials, or extraneous TEM situations without careful consideration. Generally, polepieces for TEM are designed using finite element analysis of generated magnetic fields to ensure symmetry.

Magnetic objective lens systems have been used in TEM to achieve atomic-scale resolution while maintaining a magnetic field free environment at the plane of the sample, but the method of doing so still requires a large magnetic field above (and below) the sample, thus negating any reciprocity enhancement effects that one might expect. This system works by placing the sample in between the front and back objective lens polepieces, as in an ordinary TEM, but the two polepieces are kept in exact mirror symmetry with respect to the sample plane between them. Meanwhile, their excitation polarities are exactly opposite, generating magnetic fields that cancel almost perfectly at the plane of the sample. However, since they do not cancel elsewhere, the electron trajectory must still pass through magnetic fields.

Reciprocity can also be used to understand the main difference between TEM and scanning transmission electron microscopy (STEM), which is characterized in principle by switching the position of the electron source and observation point. This is effectively the same as reversing time on a TEM so that electrons travel in the opposite direction. Therefore, under appropriate conditions (in which reciprocity does apply), knowledge of TEM imaging can be useful in taking and interpreting images with STEM.

== See also ==
- Reciprocity (electromagnetism)
