= Unbiased rendering =

Type of rendering in computer graphics

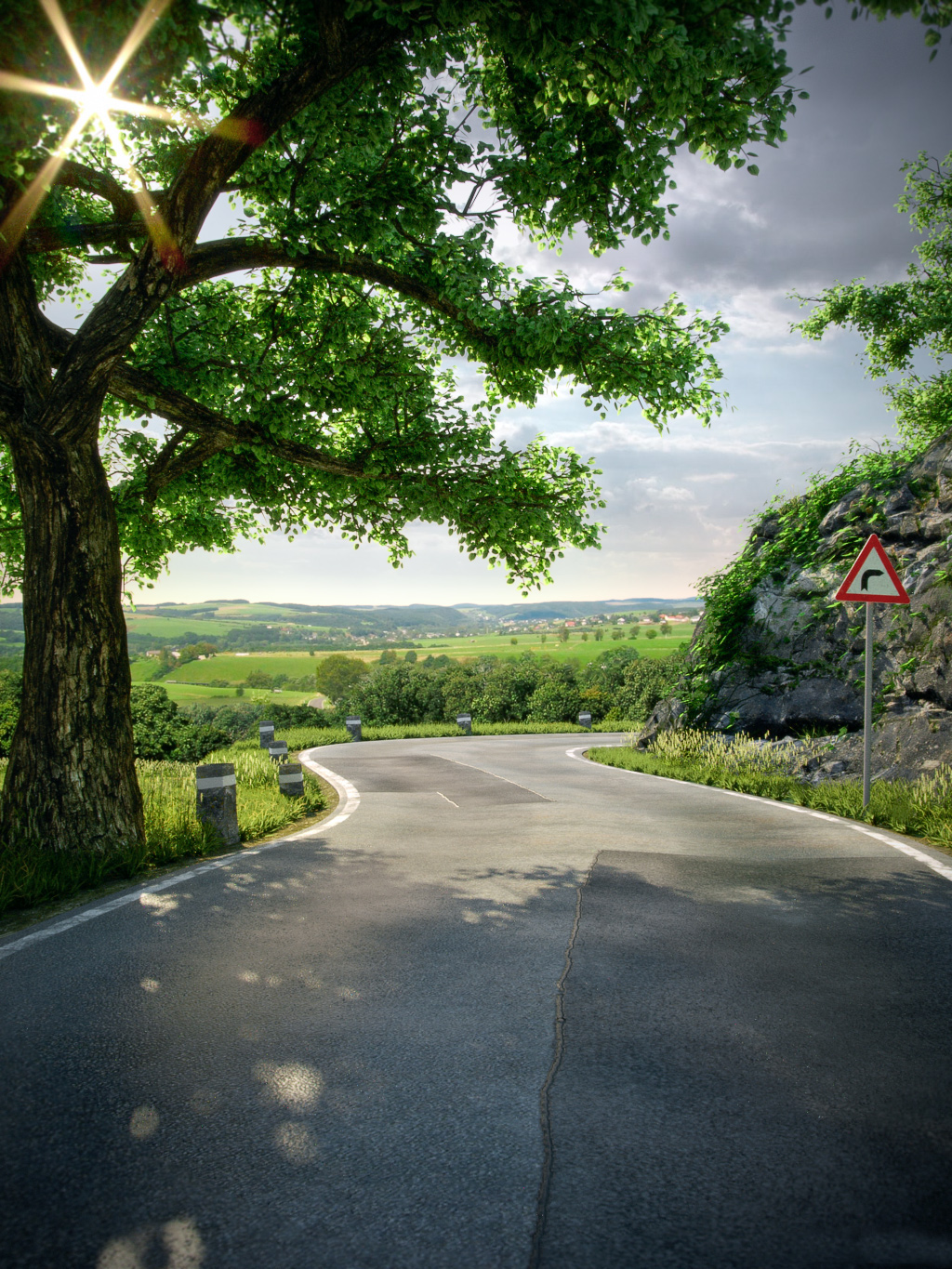
Indigo Renderer is unbiased. This 2009 render is of a German country road.

In computer graphics, unbiased rendering or photorealistic rendering are rendering techniques that avoid systematic errors, or statistical bias, in computing an image's radiance. Bias in this context means inaccuracies like dimmer light or missing effects such as soft shadows, caused by approximations. Unbiased methods, such as path tracing and its derivatives, simulate real-world lighting and shading with full physical accuracy. In contrast, biased methods, including traditional ray tracing, sacrifice precision for speed by using approximations that introduce errors—often seen as blur. This blur reduces variance (random noise) by averaging light samples, enabling faster computation with fewer samples needed for a clean image.

== Mathematical definition ==
In mathematical terms, an unbiased estimator's expected value (E) is the population mean, regardless of the number of observations. The Errors in an image produced by unbiased rendering are due to random statistical variance, which appears as high-frequency noise. Variance in this context decreases by n (standard deviation decreases by n) for n data points. Consequently, four times as much data is required to halve the standard deviation of the error, making unbiased rendering less suitable for real-time or interactive applications. An image that appears noiseless and smooth from an unbiased renderer is probabilistically correct.

== Caustics example ==
An unbiased technique, like path tracing, cannot consider all possible light paths due to their infinite number. It may not select ideal paths for a given render, as this would introduce bias. For example, path tracing struggles with caustics from a point light source because it is unlikely to randomly generate the exact path needed for accurate reflection.

On the other hand, progressive photon mapping (PPM), a biased technique, handles caustics effectively. Although biased, PPM is consistent, meaning that as the number of samples increases to infinity, the bias error approaches zero, and the probability that the estimate is correct reaches one.

== List of unbiased rendering methods ==
- Path tracing
- Bidirectional path tracing
- Metropolis light transport and the related "energy redistribution path tracing" (ESPT)

== List of unbiased renderers ==
- Arion
- Arnold
- Cycles
- Kerkythea
- LuxRender
- Mantra
- Maxwell Render
- Octane Render
- Fstorm Render (external link)

== See also ==
- Global illumination (GI)
- Physically based rendering (PBR)
- Non-photorealistic rendering (NPR)

== Bibliography ==
- "fryrender F.A.Q." RandomControl, SLU. Archived from the original on 2016-03-03.
- Mike Farnsworth. "Biased vs Unbiased Rendering". RenderSpud.
- "How to choose rendering software".
