= Color bleeding (computer graphics) =

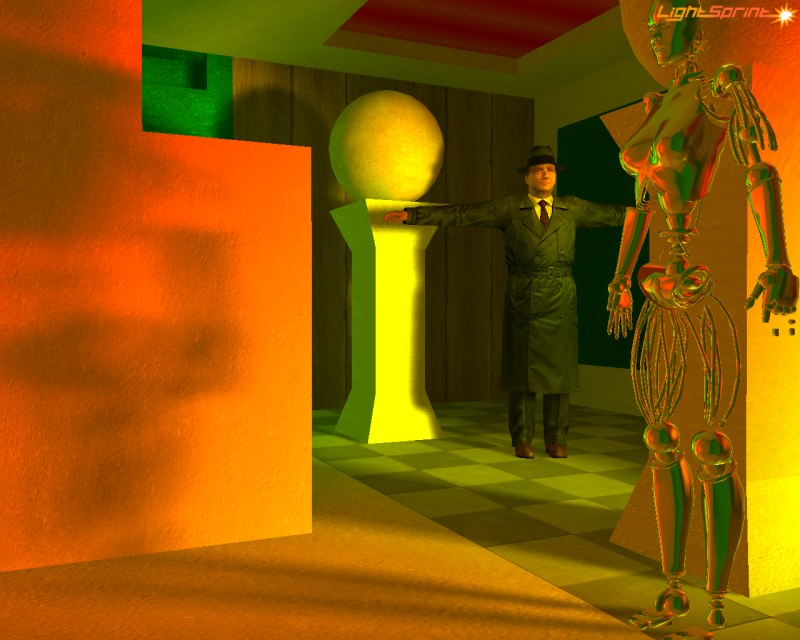
Color bleeding real time (Lightsprint middle-ware)

In computer graphics and 3D rendering, color bleeding is the phenomenon in which objects or surfaces are colored by reflection of colored light from nearby surfaces.

This is a visible effect that appears when a scene is rendered with Radiosity or full global illumination, or can otherwise be simulated by adding colored lights to a 3D scene.

== See also ==
- Attribute clash
- Radiosity
