= Jack Elton Bresenham =

American computer scientist

Jack Elton Bresenham (born October 11, 1937, Clovis, New Mexico, US) is a former professor of computer science.

== Biography ==
Bresenham retired from 27 years of service at IBM as a Senior Technical Staff Member in 1987. He taught for 16 years at Winthrop University and has nine patents. He has four children.

Bresenham's line algorithm, developed in 1962, is his most well-known innovation. It determines which points on a 2-dimensional raster should be plotted in order to form a straight line between two given points, and is commonly used to draw lines on a computer screen. It is one of the earliest algorithms discovered in the field of computer graphics. The midpoint circle algorithm shares some similarities to his line algorithm and is known as Bresenham's circle algorithm.

- Ph.D., Stanford University, 1964
- MSIE, Stanford University, 1960
- BSEE, University of New Mexico, 1959

== See also ==
- List of computer scientists
- Bresenham's line algorithm
