= Xiaolin Wu's line algorithm =

Line algorithm with antialiasing

Demonstration of Xiaolin Wu's algorithm

Xiaolin Wu's line algorithm is an algorithm for line antialiasing.

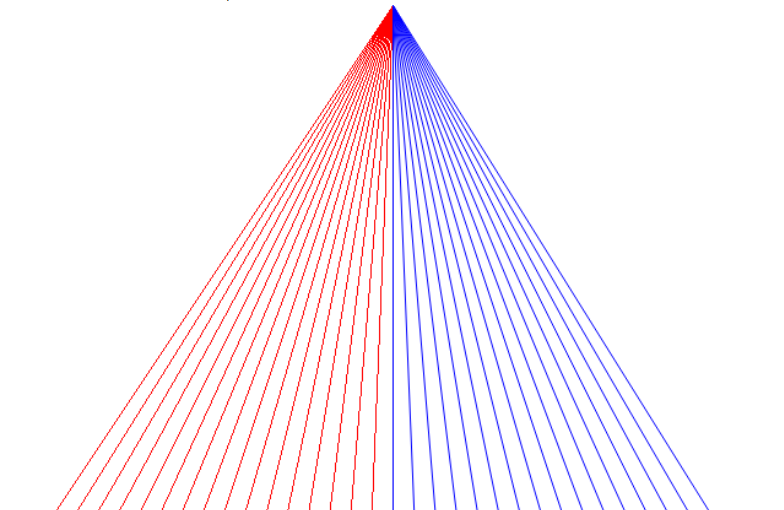
Anti-Aliased Lines (blue) generated with Xiaolin Wu's line algorithm alongside standard lines (red) generated with Bresenham's line algorithm

== Antialiasing technique ==
Xiaolin Wu's line algorithm was presented in the article "An Efficient Antialiasing Technique" in the July 1991 issue of Computer Graphics, as well as in the article "Fast Antialiasing" in the June 1992 issue of Dr. Dobb's Journal.

Bresenham's algorithm draws lines extremely quickly, but it does not perform anti-aliasing. In addition, it cannot handle any cases where the line endpoints do not lie exactly on integer points of the pixel grid. A naive approach to anti-aliasing the line would take an extremely long time. Wu's algorithm is comparatively fast, but is still slower than Bresenham's algorithm. The algorithm consists of drawing pairs of pixels straddling the line, each coloured according to its distance from the line. Pixels at the line ends are handled separately. Lines less than one pixel long are handled as a special case.

An extension to the algorithm for circle drawing was presented by Xiaolin Wu in the book Graphics Gems II. Just as the line drawing algorithm is a replacement for Bresenham's line drawing algorithm, the circle drawing algorithm is a replacement for Bresenham's circle drawing algorithm.

== Algorithm ==
Like Bresenham’s line algorithm, this method steps along one axis and considers the two nearest pixels to the ideal line. Instead of choosing the nearest, it draws both, with intensities proportional to their vertical distance from the true line. This produces smoother, anti-aliased lines.

Animation showing symmetry of Wu's line algorithm

The pseudocode below assumes a line where $x_0 < x_1$, $y_0 < y_1$, and the slope $k = \frac{dy}{dx}$ satisfies $0 \le k \le 1$. This is a standard simplification — the algorithm can be extended to all directions using symmetry.

The algorithm is well-suited to older CPUs and microcontrollers because:

- It avoids floating point arithmetic in the main loop (only used to initialize d)
- It renders symmetrically from both ends, halving the number of iterations
- The main loop uses only addition and bit shifts — no multiplication or division

def draw_line(x0, y0, x1, y1):
    N := 8     # brightness resolution (bits)
    M := 15    # fixed-point fractional bits
    I := maximum brightness value

    # Compute gradient and convert to fixed-point step
    k := float(y1 - y0) / (x1 - x0)
    d := floor((k << M) + 0.5)

    # Start with fully covered pixels at each end
    img[x0, y0] := img[x1, y1] := I

    D := 0     # Fixed-point accumulator

    while true:
        x0 := x0 + 1
        x1 := x1 - 1
        if x0 > x1:
            break

        D := D + d
        if D overflows:
            y0 := y0 + 1
            y1 := y1 - 1

        # Brightness = upper N bits of fractional part of D
        v := D >> (M - N)

        img[x0, y0]     := img[x1, y1]    := I - v
        img[x0, y0 + 1] := img[x1, y1 -1] := v

=== Floating Point Implementation ===
function plot(x, y, c) is
    plot the pixel at (x, y) with brightness c (where 0 ≤ c ≤ 1)

// fractional part of x
function fpart(x) is
    return x - floor(x)

function rfpart(x) is
    return 1 - fpart(x)

function drawLine(x0,y0,x1,y1) is
    boolean steep := abs(y1 - y0) > abs(x1 - x0)
    
    if steep then
        swap(x0, y0)
        swap(x1, y1)
    end if
    if x0 > x1 then
        swap(x0, x1)
        swap(y0, y1)
    end if
    
    dx := x1 - x0
    dy := y1 - y0

    if dx == 0.0 then
        gradient := 1.0
    else
        gradient := dy / dx
    end if

    // handle first endpoint
    xend := floor(x0)
    yend := y0 + gradient * (xend - x0)
    xgap := 1 - (x0 - xend)
    xpxl1 := xend // this will be used in the main loop
    ypxl1 := floor(yend)
    if steep then
        plot(ypxl1,   xpxl1, rfpart(yend) * xgap)
        plot(ypxl1+1, xpxl1,  fpart(yend) * xgap)
    else
        plot(xpxl1, ypxl1  , rfpart(yend) * xgap)
        plot(xpxl1, ypxl1+1,  fpart(yend) * xgap)
    end if
    intery := yend + gradient // first y-intersection for the main loop
    
    // handle second endpoint
    xend := ceil(x1)
    yend := y1 + gradient * (xend - x1)
    xgap := 1 - (xend - x1)
    xpxl2 := xend //this will be used in the main loop
    ypxl2 := floor(yend)
    if steep then
        plot(ypxl2  , xpxl2, rfpart(yend) * xgap)
        plot(ypxl2+1, xpxl2,  fpart(yend) * xgap)
    else
        plot(xpxl2, ypxl2,  rfpart(yend) * xgap)
        plot(xpxl2, ypxl2+1, fpart(yend) * xgap)
    end if
    
    // main loop
    if steep then
        for x from xpxl1 + 1 to xpxl2 - 1 do
           begin
                plot(floor(intery)  , x, rfpart(intery))
                plot(floor(intery)+1, x,  fpart(intery))
                intery := intery + gradient
           end
    else
        for x from xpxl1 + 1 to xpxl2 - 1 do
           begin
                plot(x, floor(intery),  rfpart(intery))
                plot(x, floor(intery)+1, fpart(intery))
                intery := intery + gradient
           end
    end if
end function
