= Bresenham's line algorithm =

Line-drawing algorithm

Bresenham's line algorithm is a line drawing algorithm that determines the points of an n-dimensional raster that should be selected in order to form a close approximation to a straight line between two points. It is commonly used to draw line primitives in a bitmap image (e.g. on a computer screen), as it uses only integer addition, subtraction, and bit shifting, all of which are very cheap operations in historically common computer architectures. It is an incremental error algorithm, and one of the earliest algorithms developed in the field of computer graphics. An extension to the original algorithm called the midpoint circle algorithm may be used for drawing circles.

While algorithms such as Wu's algorithm are also frequently used in modern computer graphics because they can support antialiasing, Bresenham's line algorithm is still important because of its speed and simplicity. The algorithm is used in hardware such as plotters and in the graphics chips of modern graphics cards. It can also be found in many software graphics libraries. Because the algorithm is very simple, it is often implemented in either the firmware or the graphics hardware of modern graphics cards.

The label "Bresenham" is used today for a family of algorithms extending or modifying Bresenham's original algorithm.

== History ==
Bresenham's line algorithm is named after Jack Elton Bresenham who developed it in 1962 at IBM. In 2001, Bresenham wrote:

I was working in the computation lab at IBM's San Jose development lab. A Calcomp plotter had been attached to an IBM 1401 via the 1407 typewriter console. [The algorithm] was in production use by summer 1962, possibly a month or so earlier. Programs in those days were freely exchanged among corporations so Calcomp (Jim Newland and Calvin Hefte) had copies. When I returned to Stanford in Fall 1962, I put a copy in the Stanford comp center library. A description of the line drawing routine was accepted for presentation at the 1963 ACM national convention in Denver, Colorado. It was a year in which no proceedings were published, only the agenda of speakers and topics in an issue of Communications of the ACM. A person from the IBM Systems Journal asked me after I made my presentation if they could publish the paper. I happily agreed, and they printed it in 1965.

== Method ==
Illustration of the result of Bresenham's line algorithm. (0,0) is at the top left corner of the grid, (1,1) is at the top left end of the line and (11, 5) is at the bottom right end of the line.

The following conventions will be applied:

- the top-left is (0,0) such that pixel coordinates increase to the right and downwards (e.g. that the pixel at (7,4) is directly above the pixel at (7,5)), and
- the pixel centers have integer coordinates.

The endpoints of the line are the pixels at $(x_0,y_0)$ and $(x_1,y_1)$, where the first coordinate of the pair is the column and the second is the row.

The algorithm will be initially presented only for the octant in which the segment goes down and to the right ($x_0 \leq x_1$ and $y_0 \leq y_1$), and its horizontal projection $x_1-x_0$ is longer than the vertical projection $y_1-y_0$ (the line has a positive slope less than 1). In this octant, for each column x between $x_0$ and $x_1$, there is exactly one row y (computed by the algorithm) containing a pixel of the line, while each row between $y_0$ and $y_1$ may contain multiple rasterized pixels.

Bresenham's algorithm chooses the integer y corresponding to the pixel center that is closest to the ideal (fractional) y for the same x; on successive columns y can remain the same or increase by 1. The general equation of the line through the endpoints is given by:

$$\frac{y - y_0}{y_1-y_0} = \frac{x-x_0}{x_1-x_0}$$.

Since we know the column, x, the pixel's row, y, is given by rounding this quantity to the nearest integer:

$$y = \frac{y_1-y_0}{x_1-x_0} (x-x_0) + y_0$$.

The slope $(y_1-y_0)/(x_1-x_0)$ only depends on the endpoint coordinates and can be precomputed, and the ideal y for successive integer values of x can be computed starting from $y_0$ and repeatedly adding the slope.

In practice, the algorithm does not keep track of the y coordinate, which increases by m = ∆y/∆x each time the x increases by one; it keeps an error bound at each stage, which represents the negative of the distance from (a) the point where the line exits the pixel to (b) the top edge of the pixel. This value is first set to $y_0-0.5$ (due to using the pixel's center coordinates), and is incremented by m each time the x coordinate is incremented by one. If the error becomes greater than 0.5, we know that the line has moved upwards one pixel, and that we must increment our y coordinate and readjust the error to represent the distance from the top of the new pixel – which is done by subtracting one from error.

== Derivation ==
To derive Bresenham's algorithm, two steps must be taken: first, the equation of a line is transformed from the typical slope-intercept form into an implicit equation with integer coefficients; second, this new equation is used to draw the line based on the idea of error accumulation.

=== Line equation ===
y=f(x)=0.5x+1 or f(x,y)=x-2y+2=0

Positive and negative half-planes

The slope-intercept form of a line is written as

$$y = f(x) = mx + b$$

where $m$ is the slope and $b$ is the y-intercept. Because this is a function of only $x$, it can't represent a vertical line. Therefore, it would be useful to make this equation written as a function of both $x$ and $y$ to be able to draw lines at any angle. The slope of a line can be expressed as "rise over run", or $\Delta y/\Delta x$. Then, using algebraic manipulation,

$$\begin{align}
y & = mx + b \\
y & = \frac{\Delta y}{\Delta x} x + b \\
(\Delta x) y & = (\Delta y) x + (\Delta x) b \\
0 & = (\Delta y) x - (\Delta x) y + (\Delta x) b
\end{align}$$

Letting this last equation be a function of $x$ and $y$, it can be written as

$$f(x,y) := Ax + By + C = 0$$

where the constants are

- $A = \Delta y = y_1 - y_0$
- $B = - \Delta x = - (x_1 - x_0)$
- $C = (\Delta x) b = (x_1 - x_0) b$

The line is then defined for some constants $A$, $B$, and $C$ anywhere $f(x,y) = 0$. That is, for any $(x,y)$ not on the line, $f(x,y) \ne 0$. This form involves only integers if $x$ and $y$ are integers, since the constants $A$, $B$, and $C$ are defined as integers.

As an example, the line $y=\frac{1}{2}x + 1$ could be written as $f(x,y) = x - 2y + 2$. The point (2,2) is on the line

$$f(2,2) = x - 2y + 2 = (2) - 2(2) + 2 = 2 - 4 + 2 = 0$$

and the point (2,3) is not on the line

$$f(2,3) = (2) - 2(3) + 2 = 2 - 6 + 2 = -2$$

and neither is the point (2,1)

$$f(2,1) = (2) - 2(1) + 2 = 2 - 2 + 2 = 2$$

Notice that the points (2,1) and (2,3) are on opposite sides of the line and $f(x,y)$ evaluates to positive or negative. A line splits a plane into halves. The half-plane that has a negative $f(x,y)$ can be called the negative half-plane, and the other half can be called the positive half-plane. This observation is very important for the remainder of the derivation.

=== Algorithm ===
The starting point is on the line

$$f(x_0, y_0) = 0$$

because Bresenham's algorithm assumes integer-coordinate endpoints on the pixel grid. There is no fundamental reason, however, that a line must have integer-coordinate endpoints to be rasterized.

Candidate point (2,2) in blue and two candidate points in green (3,2) and (3,3)

Keeping in mind that the slope is at most $1$, the problem now presents itself as to whether the next point should be at $(x_0 + 1, y_0)$ or $(x_0 + 1, y_0 + 1)$. Perhaps intuitively, the point should be chosen based upon which is closer to the line at $x_0 + 1$. If it is closer to the former then include the former point on the line, if the latter then the latter. To answer this, evaluate the line function at the midpoint between these two points:

$$f(x_0 + 1, y_0 + \tfrac 1 2)$$

If the value of this is positive then the ideal line is below the midpoint and closer to the candidate point $(x_0+1,y_0+1)$; i.e. the y coordinate should increase. Otherwise, the ideal line passes through or above the midpoint, and the y coordinate should stay the same, in which case the point $(x_0+1,y_0)$ is chosen. The value of the line function at this midpoint is the sole determinant of which point should be chosen.

The adjacent image shows the blue point (2,2) chosen to be on the line with two candidate points in green (3,2) and (3,3). The black point (3, 2.5) is the midpoint between the two candidate points.

=== Algorithm for integer arithmetic ===
Alternatively, the difference between points can be used instead of evaluating f(x,y) at midpoints. This alternative method allows for integer-only arithmetic, which is generally faster than using floating-point arithmetic. To derive the other method, define the difference to be as follows:

$$D_i = f(x_i+1,y_i+\tfrac 1 2) - f(x_0,y_0)$$

For the first decision, this formulation is equivalent to the midpoint method since $f(x_0,y_0)=0$ at the starting point. Simplifying this expression yields:

$$\begin{array}{rclcl}
D_0 & = & \left[ A(x_0+1) + B \left(y_0+\frac{1}{2}\right) + C \right] & - & \left[ A x_0 + B y_0 + C \right] \\
& = & \left[ Ax_0 + B y_0+ C + A + \frac {1}{2} B\right]  & - & \left[ A x_0 + B y_0 + C \right] \\
& = & A + \frac{1}{2} B = \Delta y - \frac{1}{2} \Delta x
\end{array}$$

Just as with the midpoint method, if $D_0$ is positive, then choose $(x_0+1,y_0+1)$, otherwise choose $(x_0+1,y_0)$.

If $(x_0+1,y_0)$ is chosen, the change in $D_i$ will be:

$$\begin{array}{lclcl}
\Delta D &=& f(x_0+2,y_0+\tfrac 1 2) - f(x_0+1,y_0+\tfrac 1 2) &=& A &=& \Delta y \\
\end{array}$$

If $(x_0+1,y_0+1)$ is chosen the change in $D_i$ will be:

$$\begin{array}{lclcl}
\Delta D &=& f(x_0+2,y_0+\tfrac 3 2) - f(x_0+1,y_0+\tfrac 1 2) &=& A+B &=& \Delta y - \Delta x
\end{array}$$

If the new D is positive then $(x_0+2,y_0+1)$ is chosen, otherwise $(x_0+2,y_0)$. This decision can be generalized by accumulating the error on each subsequent point.

Plotting the line from (0,1) to (6,4) showing a plot of grid lines and pixels

All of the derivation for the algorithm is done. One performance issue is the 1/2 factor in the initial value of D. Since all of this is about the sign of the accumulated difference, then everything can be multiplied by 2 with no consequence.

This results in an algorithm that uses only integer arithmetic:

plotLine(x0, y0, x1, y1)
    dx = x1 - x0
    dy = y1 - y0
    D = 2*dy - dx
    y = y0

    for x from x0 to x1
        plot(x, y)
        if D > 0
            y = y + 1
            D = D + (2 * (dy - dx))
        else
            D = D + 2*dy
        end if

Running this algorithm for $f(x,y) = x-2y+2$ from (0,1) to (6,4) yields the following differences with dx=6 and dy=3:

D=2*3-6=0
Loop from 0 to 6
 * x=0: plot(0, 1), D≤0: D=0+6=6
 * x=1: plot(1, 1), D>0: D=6-12=-6, y=1+1=2, D=-6+6=0
 * x=2: plot(2, 2), D≤0: D=0+6=6
 * x=3: plot(3, 2), D>0: D=6-12=-6, y=2+1=3, D=-6+6=0
 * x=4: plot(4, 3), D≤0: D=0+6=6
 * x=5: plot(5, 3), D>0: D=6-12=-6, y=3+1=4, D=-6+6=0
 * x=6: plot(6, 4), D≤0: D=0+6=6

The result of this plot is shown to the right. The plotting can be viewed by plotting at the intersection of lines (blue circles) or filling in pixel boxes (yellow squares). Regardless, the plotting is the same.

=== All cases ===
However, as mentioned above, this only works for octant zero, that is lines starting at the origin with a slope between 0 and 1, where x increases by exactly 1 per iteration and y increases by 0 or 1.

The algorithm can be extended to cover slopes between 0 and -1 by checking whether y needs to increase or decrease (i.e. dy < 0):

plotLineLow(x0, y0, x1, y1)
    dx = x1 - x0
    dy = y1 - y0
    yi = 1
    if dy < 0
        yi = -1
        dy = -dy
    end if
    D = (2 * dy) - dx
    y = y0

    for x from x0 to x1
        plot(x, y)
        if D > 0
            y = y + yi
            D = D + (2 * (dy - dx))
        else
            D = D + 2*dy
        end if

By switching the x and y axis an implementation for positive or negative steep slopes can be written as

plotLineHigh(x0, y0, x1, y1)
    dx = x1 - x0
    dy = y1 - y0
    xi = 1
    if dx < 0
        xi = -1
        dx = -dx
    end if
    D = (2 * dx) - dy
    x = x0

    for y from y0 to y1
        plot(x, y)
        if D > 0
            x = x + xi
            D = D + (2 * (dx - dy))
        else
            D = D + 2*dx
        end if

A complete solution would need to detect whether x1 > x0 or y1 > y0 and reverse the input coordinates before drawing, thus

plotLine(x0, y0, x1, y1)
    if abs(y1 - y0) < abs(x1 - x0)
        if x0 > x1
            plotLineLow(x1, y1, x0, y0)
        else
            plotLineLow(x0, y0, x1, y1)
        end if
    else
        if y0 > y1
            plotLineHigh(x1, y1, x0, y0)
        else
            plotLineHigh(x0, y0, x1, y1)
        end if
    end if

In low level implementations which access the video memory directly, it would be typical for the special cases of vertical and horizontal lines to be handled separately as they can be highly optimized.

Some versions use Bresenham's principles of integer incremental error to perform all octant line draws, balancing the positive and negative error between the x and y coordinates:

plotLine(x0, y0, x1, y1)
    dx = abs(x1 - x0)
    sx = x0 < x1 ? 1 : -1
    dy = -abs(y1 - y0)
    sy = y0 < y1 ? 1 : -1
    error = dx + dy
    
    while true
        plot(x0, y0)
        e2 = 2 * error
        if e2 >= dy
            if x0 == x1 break
            error = error + dy
            x0 = x0 + sx
        end if
        if e2 <= dx
            if y0 == y1 break
            error = error + dx
            y0 = y0 + sy
        end if
    end while

== Similar algorithms ==
The Bresenham algorithm can be interpreted as slightly modified digital differential analyzer (using 0.5 as error threshold instead of 0, which is required for non-overlapping polygon rasterizing).

The principle of using an incremental error in place of division operations has other applications in graphics. It is possible to use this technique to calculate the U,V co-ordinates during the raster scanning of texture-mapped polygons. The voxel heightmap software rendering engines seen in some PC games also used this principle.

Bresenham also published a Run-Slice computational algorithm: while the above described Run-Length algorithm runs the loop on the major axis, the Run-Slice variation loops the other way. This method has been represented in a number of US patents:

- US patent 5815163, "Method and apparatus to draw line slices during calculation"
- US patent 5740345, "Method and apparatus for displaying computer graphics data stored in a compressed format with an efficient color indexing system"
- US patent 5657435, "Run slice line draw engine with non-linear scaling capabilities"
- US patent 5627957, "Run slice line draw engine with enhanced processing capabilities"
- US patent 5627956, "Run slice line draw engine with stretching capabilities"
- US patent 5617524, "Run slice line draw engine with shading capabilities"
- US patent 5611029, "Run slice line draw engine with non-linear shading capabilities"
- US patent 5604852, "Method and apparatus for displaying a parametric curve on a video display"
- US patent 5600769, "Run slice line draw engine with enhanced clipping techniques"

The algorithm has been extended to:

- Draw lines of arbitrary thickness, an algorithm created by Alan Murphy at IBM;
- Draw multiple kinds of curves (circles, ellipses, cubic, quadratic, and rational Bézier curves) and antialiased lines and curves; a set of algorithms by Alois Zingl.

== See also ==
- Digital differential analyzer (graphics algorithm), a simple and general method for rasterizing lines and triangles
- Xiaolin Wu's line algorithm, a similarly fast method of drawing lines with antialiasing
- Midpoint circle algorithm, a similar algorithm for drawing circles
