= Urban Brain Studios =

American Software Company

Urban Brain Studios Inc.
- Type: Private
- Industry: Video games
- Founded: 2009
- Headquarters: Los Angeles, California, USA
- Area served: Worldwide
- Products: Chat Mapper
- Website: www.urbanbrainstudios.com

Urban Brain Studios is a Studio City, CA based software company that develops video game design tools for PC.

Their most recent software, Chat Mapper, provides a basis for prototyping nonlinear conversations in video games and is the first commercial software package designed solely for this purpose. The software concept is based loosely on works by Owen, et al., and Arinbjarnar, describing the importance of interactive nonlinear dialogue in video games.

Urban Brain Studios was acquired by LearnBrite in Q1 2015.
