= View synthesis =

In computer graphics, view synthesis, or novel view synthesis, is a task which consists of generating images of a specific subject or scene from a specific point of view, when the only available information is pictures taken from different points of view.

This task was only recently (late 2010s – early 2020s) tackled with significant success, mostly as a result of advances in machine learning. Notable successful methods are Neural radiance fields and 3D Gaussian Splatting.

Applications of view synthesis are numerous, one of them being Free view point television. The technique has also been applied to real-estate marketing, where novel views of a listing's interior are generated from a limited set of photographs for use in virtual home staging.

== See also ==
- 3D reconstruction from multiple images
- Image-based modeling and rendering
- Image synthesis
