= Medical animation =

Short educational film rendered using 3D computer graphics

A medical animation is a short educational film, usually based around a physiological or surgical topic, that is rendered using 3D computer graphics. While it may be intended for an array of audiences, the medical animation is most commonly utilized as an instructional tool for medical professionals or their patients.

Early medical animations were limited to basic wire-frame models because of low processor speed. However, rapid evolution in microprocessor design and computer memory has led to animations that are significantly more intricate.

The medical animation may be viewed as a standalone visualization, or in combination with other sensory input devices, such as head-mounted displays, stereoscopic lenses, haptic gloves, interactive workstations, or Cave Automatic Virtual Environments (CAVEs).

== History ==
Though evolved from the field of realistic medical illustrations (such as those created by Flemish anatomist Andreas Vesalius in the 16th century), medical animations are also indebted to motion picture technology and computer-generated imagery.

The term medical animation predates the advent of computer-generated graphics by approximately three decades. Though the first computer animation was created at Bell Telephone Labs in 1963, the phrase "medical animation" appears in scholarly contexts as early as 1932 in the Journal of Biological Photography. As discussed by Clarke and Hoshall, the term referred to two-dimensional illustrated motion pictures produced for inclusion in films screened for medical students.

The creation of the computer-generated medical animation began in earnest in the early 1970s. The first description of the use of 3D computer graphics for a medical purpose can be found in an issue of the journal Science, dated 1975. Its authors, a team of researchers from the Departments of Chemistry and of Biochemistry and Biophysics at Texas A&M University, described the potential uses of medical animation for visualizing complex macromolecules.

By the late 1980s, medical animation had become a distinct modality of physiological and surgical instruction. By that point, researchers had suggested that the 3D medical animations could illustrate physiological, molecular or anatomical concepts that might otherwise be infeasible.

Today's medical animation industry comprises one facet of the non-entertainment computer animation industry, which has annual revenues of $15 billion per year worldwide.

== Applications ==
=== Patient Education ===
A growing trend among medical animation studios is the creation of clips focused on explaining surgical procedures or pharmaceutical mechanisms of action in terms simple enough for a layperson to understand. These animations may be found on hospital websites, in doctor's office workstations, online health websites, or via medical animation studios themselves. Such animations may also appear on television shows, OTT platforms and other popular entertainment venues as a way to educate an audience on a medical topic under discussion.

Occasionally, this form of animation is used in-hospital. In this context, clips may be used in order to get fully informed consent from patients facing surgery or medical treatment. Likewise, studies have suggested that patient-educating medical animations may be able to reduce the rate of accidental wrong-site surgeries.

=== Medical simulation ===
Due to both the relative scarcity of cadavers to be used for surgical instruction and to the dwindling use of animals and patients who have not given consent, institutes may utilize medical animations as a way to teach doctors-to-be anatomical and surgical concepts. Such simulations may be viewed passively (as in the case of 3D medical animations included via CD-ROM in medical textbook packages) or using interactive controls. The stimulation of hand-eye skills using haptics is another possible use of medical animation technology, one that stems from the replacement of cadavers in surgical classrooms with task trainers and mannequins.

The creation of proportionally accurate virtual bodies is often accomplished using medical scans, such as computed tomography (CT) or magnetic resonance imaging (MRI). Such techniques represent a cost- and time-saving move away from the creation of medical animations using sectioned cadavers. For instance, the National Library of Medicine's Visible Human Project created 3D medical animations of the male and female bodies by scanning cadavers using CT technology, after which they were frozen, shaved into millimeter-thick sections and recorded using high-resolution photographs.

By comparison, medical animations made using only scanned data can recreate the internal structures of live patients, often in the context of surgical planning.

=== Cellular and molecular animation ===
Medical animations are often employed as a method of visualizing the vast number of microscopic processes that occur in the human body. These may involve the interplay between organelles, the transcription of DNA, the molecular action of enzymes, the interactions between pathogens and white blood cells or virtually any other cellular or sub-cellular process.

Molecular animations are similar in that they depict structures that are too small for the human eye to see. However, this latter category is also capable of illustrating atomic structures, which are often too minute to be visualized with any clarity via microscopy.

Cellular animation can use models built manually or ones which originate from microscopy and subsequent polygonal 3d surface creation.

=== Pharmaceutical mechanism of action ===
As a way to explain how medications work, pharmaceutical manufacturers may provide mechanism of action animations, often through websites dedicated to specific prescription drugs. These medical visualizations typically do not represent cellular structures in a fully accurate or proportional way. Instead, mechanism of action animations may visually simplify the interaction between drug molecules and cells. These medical animations may also explain the physiological origins of the disease itself.

=== Emergency care instruction ===
Several studies have suggested that 3D medical animations may be used to instruct novices on how to perform cardiopulmonary resuscitation in an emergency. These reports usually suggest the use of pre-prepared, voice-narrated motion-capture animations that are viewed by means of a cellphone or other portable electronic device.

=== Forensic reconstruction ===
A number of applications for medical animations has been developed in the field of forensics. These include the so-called "virtutopsy," or MRI-assisted virtual autopsy, of remains that are too damaged to be otherwise inspected or reconstructed. Likewise, medical animations can appear in courtrooms, be used as forensic "reconstructions" of crime scenes or recreate the crimes themselves. The admissibility of such evidence is questionable.

=== Electronic or Interactive learning ===
Researchers have suggested that medical animations can be used to disseminate medical education materials electronically, allowing them to be accessed and utilized by professional and amateur health practitioners alike.

=== Surgical training and planning ===
Some institutes use animations both to teach medical students how to perform basic surgery, and to give seasoned surgeons the chance to expand their skill set. Multiple studies have been conducted on the effectiveness and feasibility of medical animation-based surgical pre-planning. Experimental animation tools have been created as integral technology in image-guided surgery as well. Today, surgical training uses medical animation combined with virtual reality (VR), augmented reality (AR) and simulation.

=== Medical device visualization ===
Medical animation is extensively used by manufacturers to demonstrate the design, functionality, and deployment of medical devices. These 3D visualizations help explain the mechanics of complex diagnostic equipment, surgical instruments, and implants (such as cardiovascular stents or orthopedic devices) to healthcare professionals, investors, and regulatory bodies.

== See also ==
- 3D computer graphics
- Computer animation
- Medical illustrator
- Medical illustration
- Modern animation in the United States
