= Weight-space programming =

Direct reading and writing of neural network weights by a language model

Weight-space programming is an approach in machine learning in which a general-purpose large language model (LLM) reads, interprets and directly writes the weights of another artificial neural network, without using gradient descent or a training loop. The term was introduced in November 2026 by researchers at the MIT Computer Science and Artificial Intelligence Laboratory, who used OpenAI's GPT-6 Astra model to identify what small networks had been trained to do from their weights alone, to write working networks from scratch, and to edit the Qwen3.5-0.8B language model.

== Background ==
In conventional deep learning, a network's weights are set by an optimizer during training, and working out what a trained network does from its parameters is the subject of mechanistic interpretability. Weight-space programming instead treats the weights as a medium that a language model can read and write, taking the place of the optimizer. It defines a sub-field of Weight Space Learning, which treats neural network weights as new data modality for learning and where weight editing is considered as one of several potential downstream tasks.

Early research on neural network weight-space analysis dates back to at least 2020. Eilertsen et al. investigated the weight space of trained neural networks, demonstrating that meta-classifiers could infer properties of a network's training configuration, such as hyperparameters and training datasets, directly from its weights. Independently, researchers at Google demonstrated that the predictive accuracy of trained neural networks could be estimated from their weights alone, without evaluating the networks on input data.. The first end-to-end trained approach for reading weight was published by Schürholt et al. at NeurIPS in 2021 as an autoencoder processing weight and learning a shared latent representation of them.

Hypernetworks were used as an earlier approach to writing neural-network weights. Ha, Dai and Le introduced hypernetworks in 2016, which are networks trained to generate another network's parameters. Task-conditioned hypernetworks, which generate network parameters from task identifiers or embeddings, are also distinguished from weight-space programming by the use of a predictor trained specifically to generate weights rather than a general-purpose language model.

The authors cite earlier work in which weights were set deliberately rather than learned, such as compilers that turn programs into transformer weights. The approach also differs from model editing methods such as ROME, which use a fixed algorithm to make narrow changes like updating a single fact.

== Demonstrations ==
The initial study, published as a blog post and not peer-reviewed, consisted of eight experiments. Given the unlabeled weights of four small reinforcement-learning policies, Astra correctly named the game each had been trained on. It also repaired a failing car-driving policy by editing 3.5% of its weights, and wrote game-playing networks from only the games' rules; its Breakout network scored 517.4, against 25.3 for a policy trained for 500 million steps.

In the most widely reported experiment, Astra found the source of repetitive reasoning loops in Qwen3.5-0.8B and changed 0.016% of its weights, raising its score on the MATH-500 benchmark from 7.9% to 48.1% and on GSM8K from 13.8% to 67.1%. The same procedure produced no meaningful gain on Gemma 3 270M, leading the authors to conclude that editing "could remove an obstacle that hid an ability, but it could not add an ability the model lacked."

On the same day, researcher Chandan Singh reported that Claude, working as a coding agent, hand-wrote small transformers that solved ten algorithmic tasks such as addition and sorting, though some results were affected by weaknesses in the evaluation. Other researchers showed its applicability within biosignal-based models, specifically on EEG and ECG, using Claude to write weights from scratch and reaching higher accuracies than standard gradient descent.

== Reception ==
The authors described the results as "very early" and suggested they could matter for both optimization and interpretability. Commentators noted that most experiments used networks with only thousands of weights and that the work had not been independently replicated. Software engineer Sean Goedecke argued that a skilled researcher could have performed the same tasks, describing the Qwen fix as something "a competent human researcher could have and would have done", and compared editing weights directly to patching a compiled binary. spaCy creator Matthew Honnibal called the post's framing misleading, writing that the setting in which the model worked only from raw weights, without tools or running the network, was used only on networks of about 17,000 to 172,000 weights, while every experiment on a real language model used Python and, in the Qwen case, up to 50 batches of practice problems.

== See also ==
- Explainable artificial intelligence
- Fine-tuning (deep learning)
- Hypernetwork (machine learning)
- Mechanistic interpretability
