= Photo-consistency =

In computer vision, photo-consistency determines whether a given voxel is occupied. A voxel is considered to be photo consistent when its color appears to be similar to all the cameras that can see it. Most voxel coloring or space carving techniques require using photo consistency as a check condition in Image-based modeling and rendering applications.

== Usage ==
3D Volumetric Reconstruction.

- Image registration.
- Multi-view reconstruction.
