= Hypernetwork (machine learning) =

Neural network that generates parameters for other neural networks

In machine learning, a hypernetwork is a neural network whose output supplies some or all of the parameters of other neural networks, called target networks. Its inputs can include information associated with a particular task. During its training, gradients can propagate through the generated parameters to update the hypernetwork, and once trained it can generate parameters for different conditioning inputs through a forward pass. Hypernetworks were described in a 2016 paper that demonstrated weight generation for convolutional and recurrent networks. Later research applied hypernetworks to continual learning and personalized federated learning.

== See also ==
- HyperNEAT
- Neural field
- Weight-space programming
