= Image-based modeling and rendering =

Computer imaging technique

In computer graphics and computer vision, image-based modeling and rendering (IBMR) methods rely on a set of two-dimensional images of a scene to generate a three-dimensional model and then render some novel views of this scene.

The traditional approach of computer graphics has been used to create a geometric model in 3D and try to reproject it onto a two-dimensional image. Computer vision, conversely, is mostly focused on detecting, grouping, and extracting features (edges, faces, etc.) present in a given picture and then trying to interpret them as three-dimensional clues. Image-based modeling and rendering allows the use of multiple two-dimensional images in order to generate directly novel two-dimensional images, skipping the manual modeling stage.

== Light modeling ==
Instead of considering only the physical model of a solid, IBMR methods usually focus more on light modeling. The fundamental concept behind IBMR is the plenoptic illumination function which is a parametrisation of the light field. The plenoptic function describes the light rays contained in a given volume. It can be represented with seven dimensions: a ray is defined by its position $(x,y,z)$, its orientation $(\theta,\phi)$, its wavelength $(\lambda)$ and its time $(t)$: $P (x,y,z,\theta,\phi,\lambda,t)$. IBMR methods try to approximate the plenoptic function to render a novel set of two-dimensional images from another. Given the high dimensionality of this function, practical methods place constraints on the parameters in order to reduce this number (typically to 2 to 4). A common simplification used by light field rendering and the Lumigraph reduces the plenoptic function to a four-dimensional light field, $P_4(u,v,s,t)$, in which each ray is parameterized by its intersections with two parallel planes outside the object's convex hull.

== IBMR methods and algorithms ==
- View morphing generates a transition between images
- Panoramic imaging renders panoramas using image mosaics of individual still images
- Lumigraph relies on a dense sampling of a scene
- Space carving generates a 3D model based on a photo-consistency check

== See also ==
- View synthesis
- 3D reconstruction
- Structure from motion
