= Importer (computing) =

Video game development tool

An importer is a software application that reads in a data file or metadata information in one format and converts it to another format via special algorithms (such as filters). An importer often is not an entire program by itself, but an extension to another program, implemented as a plug-in. When implemented this way, the importer reads the data from the file and converts it into the hosting application's native format.

For example, the data file for a 3D model may be written by a modeler, such as 3D Studio Max. A game developer may then want to use that model in their game's editor. An importer, part of the editor, may read in the 3D Studio Max model and convert it to the game's native format for game levels.

Importers are important tools in the video game industry. An exporter is a plug-in or application that does the converse of an importer.

== See also ==
- Data scraping
- Web scraping
- Report mining
- Mashup (web application hybrid)
- Metadata
- Comparison of feed aggregators
