= Kerkythea =

Standalone rendering system

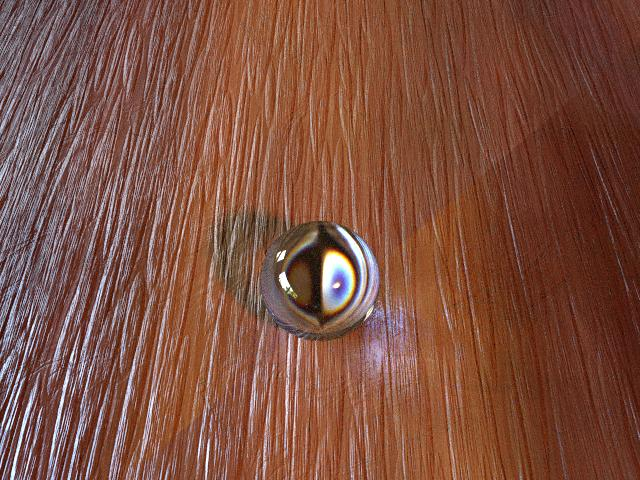
- Kerkythea is capable of rendering photorealistic caustics and global illumination.
- Developer: Ioannis Pantazopoulos
- Stable release: Kerkythea 2018 Boost / June 19, 2018; 7 years ago
- Operating system: Linux, OS X, Microsoft Windows
- Type: 3D Graphics Software
- License: Freeware
- Website: kerkythea.net

Kerkythea is a standalone rendering system that supports raytracing and Metropolis light transport, uses physically accurate materials and lighting, and is distributed as freeware. Currently, the program can be integrated with any software that can export files in obj and 3ds formats, including 3ds Max, Blender, LightWave 3D, SketchUp, Silo and Wings3D.

== History ==
Kerkythea was preceded by Phos, an experimental rendering engine developed by Ioannis Pantazopoulos during his research at the National Technical University of Athens (NTUA). Kerkythea started development in 2004 and released its first version in April 2005. Initially it was only compatible with Microsoft Windows, but an updated release in October 2005 made it Linux compatible. As of January 2016, it is also available for Mac OS X.

On January 29, 2008, Kerkythea 2008 Echo (v2.0) was released, introducing a new engine core and an "instancing brush" tool for scattering geometry. The Echo version integrated Metropolis light transport (MLT) with Bidirectional path tracing (BiPT) to solve difficult light transport problems such as complex caustics.

In May 2009, it was announced that the development team, Solid Iris Technologies, had started development of a commercial successor known as Thea Render. Solid Iris Technologies was subsequently acquired by Altair Engineering in September 2016. The Kerkythea engine also served as the foundation for the Twilight Render plugin for SketchUp. A new version called 'Boost' has been released in 2013.

In June 2018 the main developer announced the third version of Kerkythea called "Kerkythea 2018 Boost".

== Exporters ==
There are 6 official exporters for Kerkythea.

Blender
- Blend2KT
- Exporter to XML format
3D Studio Max
- 3dsMax2KT 3dsMax Exporter
Maya
- Maya2KT Maya Exporter
GMax
- GMax2KT GMax Exporter
SketchUp
- SU2KT SketchUp Exporter
- SU2KT Light Components

== Features ==
Supported 3D file formats

- 3DS format
- OBJ format
- XML (internal) format
- SIA (Silo) format (partially supported)

Supported image formats

- All supported by FreeImage library (JPEG, BMP, PNG, TGA and HDR included)

Supported materials

- Matte
- Perfect reflections/refractions
- Blurry reflections/refractions
- Translucency (SSS)
- Dielectric material
- Thin glass material
- Phong shading material
- Ward anisotropic material
- Anisotropic Ashikhmin material
- Lafortune material
- Layered material (additive combination of the above with use of alpha maps)

Supported shapes

- Triangulated meshes
- Sphere
- Planes

Supported lights

- Omni light
- Spot light
- Projector light
- Point diffuse
- Area diffuse
- Point light with spherical soft shadows
- Ambient lighting
- Sky lighting (Physical sky, SkySphere bitmap (normal or HDRI))

Supported textures

- Constant colors
- Bitmaps (normal and HDRI)
- Procedurals (Perlin noise, marble, wood, windy, checker, wireframe, normal ramp, Fresnel ramp)
- Any weighted or multiplicative combination of the above

Supported features

- Bump mapping
- Normal mapping
- Clip mapping
- Bevel mapping (an innovative KT feature)
- Edge outlining
- Depth of field
- Fog
- Isotropic volume scattering
- Faked caustics
- Faked translucency
- Dispersion
- Anti-aliasing (Texture filtering, edge antialiasing)
- Selection rendering
- Surface and material instancing

Supported camera types

- Planar projection (Pinhole, thin lens)
- Cylindrical pinhole
- Spherical pinhole

Supported rendering techniques

- Classic ray tracing
- Path tracing (Kajiya)
- Bidirectional path tracing (Veach & Guibas)
- Metropolis light transport (Kelemen, Kalos et al.)
- Photon mapping (Jensen) (mesh maps, photon maps, final gathering, irradiance caching, caustics)
- Diffuse interreflection (Ward)
- Depth rendering
- Mask rendering
- Clay rendering

Application environment

- OpenGL real-time viewer (basic staging capabilities)
- Integrated material editor
- Easy rendering customization
- Sun/sky customization
- Script system
- Command line mode

== See also ==
- POV-Ray, free and open-source ray tracing software
- List of 3D rendering software
- LuxCoreRender, free and open-source "unbiased" rendering system
