= Unreal Engine 4 =

Game engine

- Screenshot of Unreal Engine 4.20
- Original author: Tim Sweeney
- Developer: Epic Games
- Release: 4.0 / March 19, 2014; 12 years ago
- Stable release: 4.27 / August 19, 2021; 5 years ago
- Written in: C++
- Operating system: Windows, Linux, macOS, PlayStation 4, PlayStation 5, Xbox One, Xbox Series X/S, Nintendo Switch, Nintendo Switch 2, iOS, Android
- Predecessor: Unreal Engine 3
- Successor: Unreal Engine 5
- License: Source-available commercial software with royalty model for commercial use
- Website: unrealengine.com

Interactive architectural visualization developed with Unreal Engine 4 (2015)

Unreal Engine 4 (UE4) is the fourth version of Unreal Engine developed by Epic Games. UE4 began development in 2003 and was released in March 2014, with the first game using UE4 launching in April 2014. UE4 introduced support for physically based materials and a new visual programming language called "Blueprints". It was succeeded by Unreal Engine 5 in 2022.

== History ==
In August 2005, Mark Rein, vice-president of Epic Games, revealed that Unreal Engine 4 had been in development for two years. "People don't realise this but we're already two years into development of Unreal Engine 4. It certainly doesn't have a full team yet, it's just one guy and you can probably guess who that guy is," he told C&VG. Speaking in an interview in early 2008, Tim Sweeney, the founder of Epic Games, stated that he was basically the only person working on the engine, though he affirmed his research and development department would start to expand later that year, developing the engine in parallel with Unreal Engine 3. "In some way, we resemble a hardware company with our generational development of technology. We are going to have a team developing Unreal Engine 3 for years to come and a team ramping up on Unreal Engine 4. And then, as the next-gen transition begins, we will be moving everybody to that. We actually are doing parallel development for multiple generations concurrently," he said. In 2011 Sweeney said he spends 60% of his day doing research work on Unreal Engine 4.

In February 2012, Rein stated "people are going to be shocked later this year when they see Unreal Engine 4"; Epic unveiled UE4 to limited attendees at the 2012 Game Developers Conference, and a video of the engine being demonstrated by technical artist Alan Willard was released to the public on June 7, 2012, via GameTrailers TV. One of the major features planned for UE4 was real-time global illumination using voxel cone tracing, eliminating pre-computed lighting. However, this feature, called Sparse Voxel Octree Global Illumination (SVOGI) and showcased with the Elemental demo, was replaced with a similar but less computationally expensive algorithm due to performance concerns.

On March 19, 2014, at the Game Developers Conference (GDC), Epic Games released Unreal Engine 4 through a new licensing model. For a monthly subscription at US$19, developers were given access to the full version of the engine, including the C++ source code, which could be downloaded via GitHub. Any released product was subject to a 5% royalty on gross revenues. The first game released using Unreal Engine 4 was Daylight, developed with early access to the engine and released on April 29, 2014.

To prepare for the release of its free-to-play battle royale mode in Fortnite in September 2017, Epic had to make a number of Unreal Engine modifications that helped it to handle a large number (up to 100) of connections to the same server while still retaining high bandwidth and to improve the rendering of a large open in-game world. Epic said it would incorporate these changes into future updates of the Unreal Engine.

Unreal Engine 4 officially supports the following platforms as of 4.27 (August 2021): Windows, macOS, Linux, iOS, Android, Nintendo Switch, PlayStation 4, Xbox One, PlayStation 5, Xbox Series X/S, Stadia, Magic Leap, HTC Vive, Oculus, PlayStation VR, OSVR, Samsung Gear VR, and HoloLens 2. It formerly supported Google Daydream and HTML5.

== Features ==
=== Physically based materials ===
Epic Games' Brian Karis, in a 2013 SIGGRAPH presentation, described improvements made to UE4's shading model. According to Karis, Epic "decided to invest some time in improving [UE4's] shading model and embrace a more physically based material workflow". One of the goals was to "make major workflow and quality improvements in how [artists] authored materials, by layering and blending pre-made materials from a library instead of authoring components separately and redundantly for every use". The material model adopted by Epic was based on a similar model from Disney's Brent Burley, who outlined its use in Wreck-It Ralph at SIGGRAPH 2012. The base parameters of the model consisted of "BaseColor," "Metallic," "Roughness," and "Cavity". Cavity, a component not present in Disney's model, describes "shadowing from geometry smaller than [UE4's] run-time shadowing system can handle," such as the cracks between floor boards or the seams in clothing. Parameters omitted from Disney's model were "Specular," "Subsurface," "Anisotropy," "Clearcoat" and "Sheen," which are instead treated as special cases.

=== UI toolkit ===
A major focus for Unreal Engine 4 was creating tools that simplified the user interface. According to Sweeney, "with Unreal Engine 3 it was a big, complicated user interface. With Unreal Engine 4, the effort is to expose at the base level everything in a very simple, easy-to-use, and discoverable way and to build complexity on it so that the user can learn as they go".

With Unreal Engine 4, we really want to be able to build an entire small game on the scale of Angry Birds without any programming whatsoever, just mapping user input into the actions using a visual toolkit. This technology will be really valuable. We're also expanding the visual toolkit for everything: for building materials, for building animations, for managing content when we have a huge amount of game assets. We're just greatly simplifying the interface so that it's basically as easy to use as Unity.

— Sweeney, Game Developer, 2012

=== Scripting ===
In line with UE4's focus on simplicity, it included a new visual scripting system called "Blueprints" (a successor to UE3's "Kismet"), which allows for rapid development of game logic without using code, resulting in less of a divide between technical artists, designers, and programmers.

I could say: 'I'm going to convert this pillar into a blueprint [in the Engine] and add some sort of trap to it.' It means I can really go in and start enhancing my world with interaction that just would not have been possible without a technical artist, a designer and a programmer and now any one of those three can do all of it, provided they have the assets handy. The fact that I can just go in and say, 'If you're within X distance of this thing, start to glow and take my distance to it, normalize it zero to one and then just lerp [linearly interpolate] between two different brightness values, so as I reach for something it gets hot'...that would have been something do-able but very difficult for anybody except a gameplay programmer. And he wouldn't have known how to set up the assets, but now any one of the three could do it.

— Willard, Kotaku, 2012

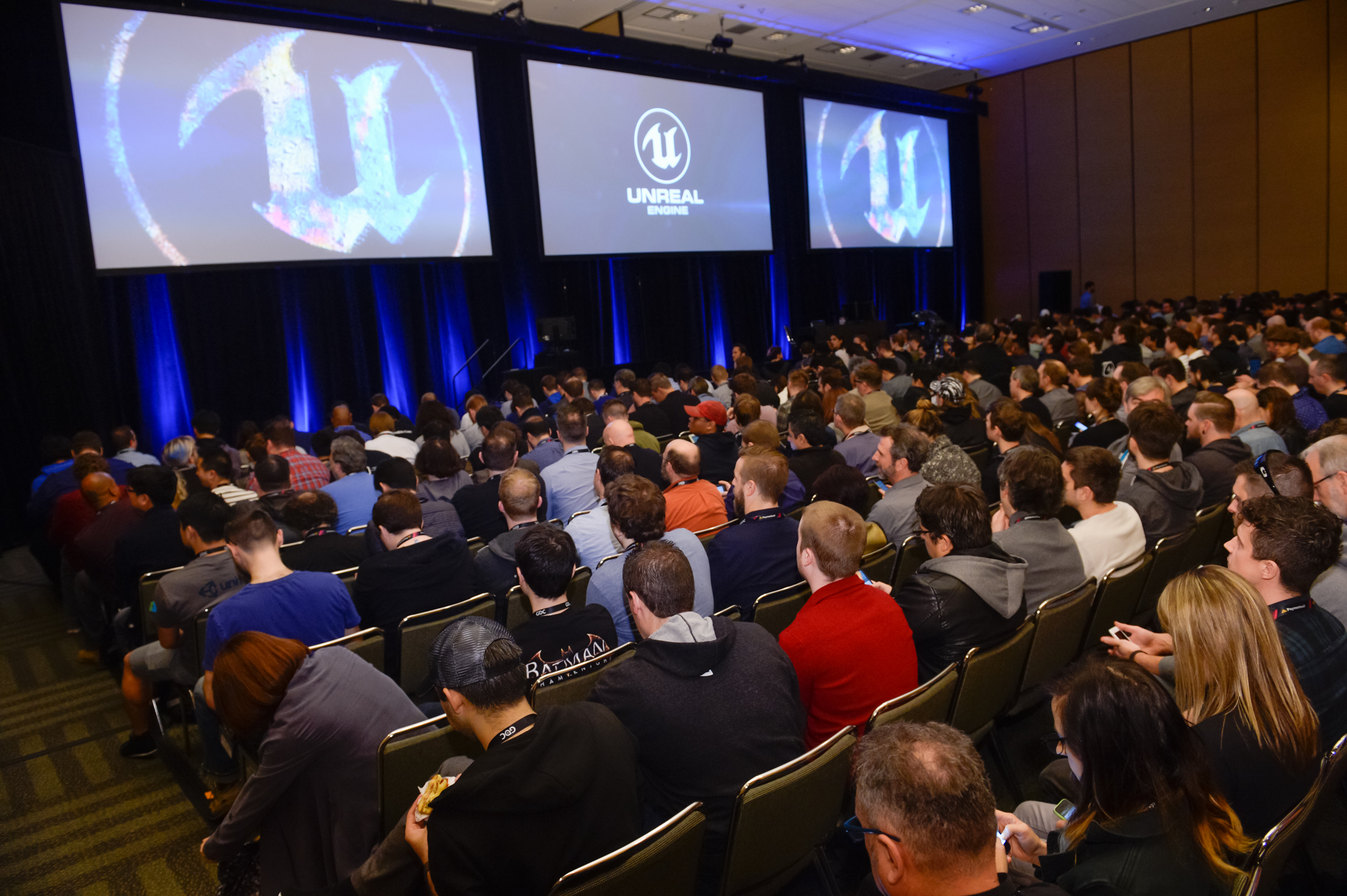
An Unreal Engine presentation at GDC 2016

=== Ray tracing ===
Real-time hardware-accelerated ray tracing in Unreal Engine 4 was first unveiled at GDC in March 2018. The Reflections tech demo in collaboration with Nvidia and ILMxLAB showcased Stormtroopers from Star Wars: The Last Jedi with ray traced area light shadows, ray traced reflections, ray traced ambient occlusion and Nvidia GameWorks denoising running in real-time. An Nvidia DGX Station with four Tesla V100 GPUs costing $100,000 was required to run the first demo in real-time. In August, the demo The Speed of Light was showcased at SIGGRAPH 2018 featuring a Porsche 911 Speedster that used diffuse global illumination. The hardware requirements were lowered from the March demo to two Nvidia Quadro RTX 6000 GPUs totalling $12,000.

In April 2019, support for real-time hardware-accelerated ray tracing was added in Unreal Engine 4.22 in beta form. It leverages Microsoft's DirectX 12 and DirectX Raytracing APIs to take advantage of the ray tracing acceleration cores in Nvidia GeForce RTX GPUs. Ray tracing could be used for dynamic global illumination, reflections, ambient occlusion and soft shadowing. An unbiased path tracer was also added for full global illumination to create in-engine reference renders.

== Licensing ==
On September 4, 2014, Epic released Unreal Engine 4 to schools and universities for free, including personal copies for students enrolled in accredited video game development, computer science, art, architecture, simulation, and visualization programs. Epic opened an Unreal Engine Marketplace for acquiring game assets. On February 19, 2015, Epic launched Unreal Dev Grants, a $5 million development fund aiming to provide grants to creative projects using Unreal Engine 4.

In March 2015, Epic released Unreal Engine 4, along with all future updates, for free for all users. In exchange, Epic established a selective royalty schedule, asking for 5% of revenue for products that make more than $3,000 per quarter. Sweeney stated that when they moved to the subscription model in 2014, use of Unreal grew by 10 times and through many smaller developers, and believed that they would draw even more uses through this new pricing scheme.

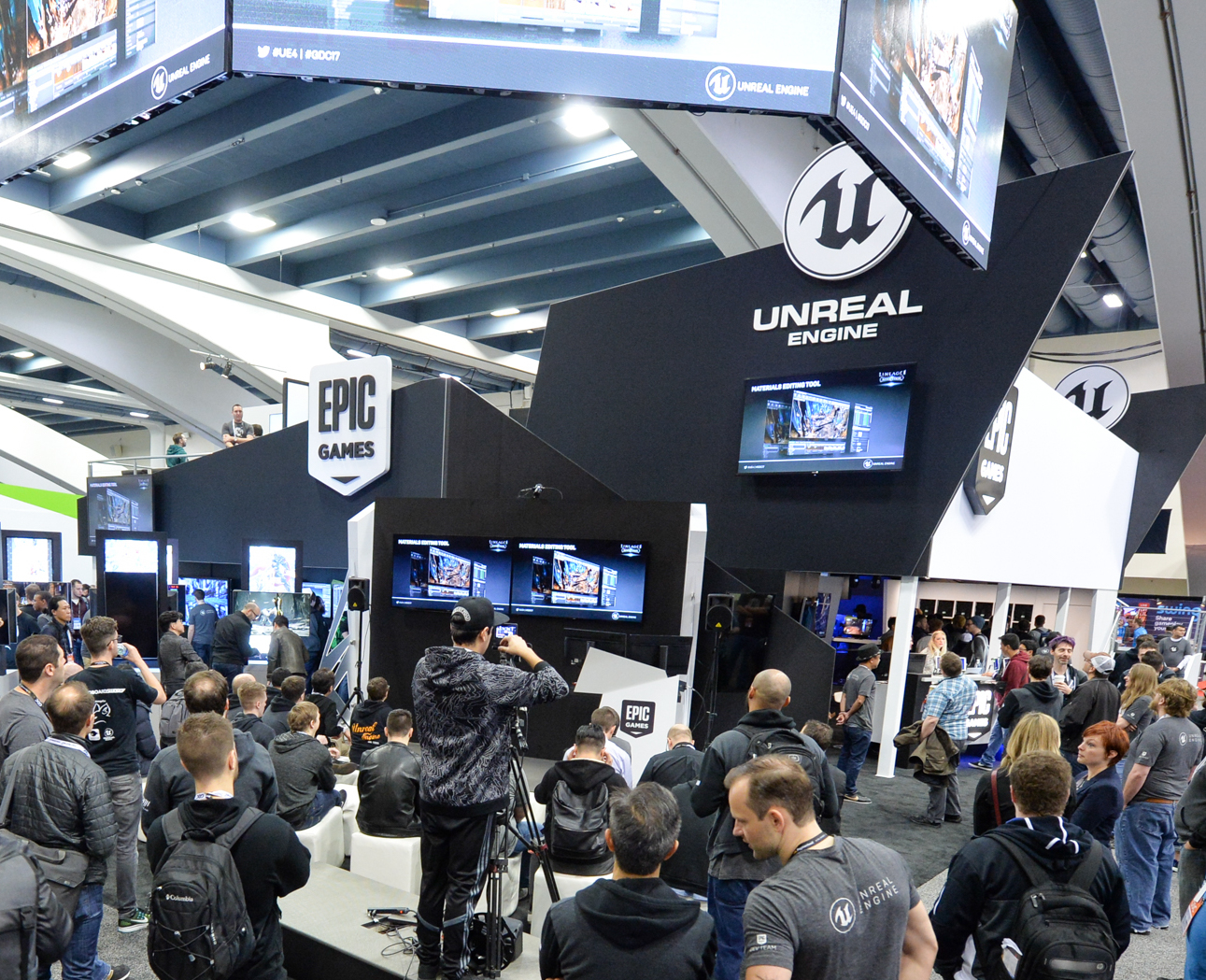
An Unreal Engine booth at GDC 2017

In an attempt to attract Unreal Engine developers, Oculus VR announced in October 2016 that it will pay royalty fees for all Unreal-powered Oculus Rift titles published on their store for up to the first $5 million of gross revenue per game.

With the opening of the Epic Games Store in December 2018, Epic declared it would not charge the 5% revenue fee on games that use the Unreal Engine and are released through the Epic Games Stores, absorbing that cost as part of the base 12% cut Epic is taking to cover other costs.

Effective May 13, 2020, and retroactive to January 1, 2020, the royalty exemption amount has been increased to US$1,000,000 in lifetime gross revenue per title.

== See also ==
- Category:Unreal Engine 4 games
