= Surface element =

Surface element may refer to

- An infinitesimal portion of a 2D surface, as used in a surface integral in a 3D space.
- The volume form of a 2D manifold
- Surfel in 3D computer graphics
- Differential (infinitesimal), an infinitesimal portion of a surface
