= The Tomorrow Children =

2016 video game

- Developer: Q-Games (Note: Additional work by Japan Studio for the original version)
- Publishers: Sony Interactive Entertainment; Q-Games (Phoenix Edition)
- Director: Dylan Cuthbert
- Producers: Kazuharu Tanaka; Hiroshi Shiina
- Artist: Dylan Cuthbert
- Composer: Joel Corelitz
- Platform: PlayStation 4
- Release: NA/EU: October 25, 2016; JP: October 26, 2016; Phoenix Edition: NA/EU: September 6, 2022; JP: September 7, 2022
- Genre: Adventure
- Modes: Single-player, multiplayer

The Tomorrow Children is an adventure video game developed by Q-Games and published by Sony Interactive Entertainment for the PlayStation 4. The game was released as an early access title on September 6, 2016 as The Tomorrow Children: Founder's Pack, and was fully released on October 25, 2016, but was shut down by Sony in 2017. Q-Games later purchased the IP and released the game on September 6, 2022 as The Tomorrow Children: Phoenix Edition. with enhancements for playing the game on backwards compatibility on PlayStation 5.

== Gameplay ==
The Tomorrow Children is a social simulation, action-based, third-person game, which is structured around cooperative town building, gathering resources, and exploration in a post-Void surreal world. Players manage projection clones, the avatars whose duty is to rebuild human civilization, reclaiming lost souls and building communities on a series of floating islands.

The central cycle of the game is traveling to islands created in the Void, collecting resources including wood, metal, coal, crystals, and matryoshka dolls, and transporting these resources back to the player's town. Collected materials allow the construction and renovation of buildings, infrastructure, and utilities to accommodate a growing number of resurrected citizens.

The players can employ diverse tools and skills, such as shovels and pickaxes to dig and mine, and Void Powers to change the landscape and make it easy to maneuver through some tricky spots. Towns are also threatened by huge monsters called Izverg that raid the town at regular intervals and have to be repelled by means of fortifications and organization.

Players and materials are shuttled between the town and the islands via a system of buses, and although players may play cooperatively, the Phoenix edition has solo play with Comrade AI companions.

The main objectives are population growth and town development. Matryoshka dolls that come out of the Void can be transformed into new citizens, and this contributes to the increase in working space and the appearance of new building opportunities. Players also make the layout of their town, buildings, and aesthetics, which make up a constantly growing settlement.

== Development ==
The Tomorrow Children was announced during Gamescom 2014 at Sony's press conference in August 2014.

Engadget has described the game as "a mix of Minecraft-esque collaborative building, social economics and a Soviet Union-themed post-apocalyptic dystopia." The Tomorrow Children runs on a proprietary game engine developed by Q-Games. The game's graphics engine utilizes new technology, aiming to achieve a Pixar-like pre-rendered CGI look with real-time 3D graphics. It utilizes the PlayStation 4's Async Compute technology extensively. It features new lighting techniques developed by Q-Games, such as cascaded voxel cone ray tracing, which simulates lighting in real-time and uses more realistic reflections rather than screen space reflections. This allows real-time global illumination, without any need for pre-calculated or pre-baked lighting. It supports direct and indirect illumination in real-time, and up to three bounces of light per pixel from all directions (compared to one bounce for Pixar films). It also features deformable landscapes, with layered depth cubes, representing the world as volumes, which are then converted to polygons as needed.

A public beta test occurred from June 3–6, 2016.

=== Audio ===
Voice casting and dialogue work was completed by Glen Gathard and team at Shepperton studios.

=== Discontinuation and relaunch ===
On July 6, 2017, six months after its launch, it was announced the game would cease operations on November 1, 2017. The game was discontinued due to the inability to properly monetise the game, in addition to the cost of running the servers. In the years following its shutdown, Cuthbert noticed that players were continuing to share screenshots and videos from the game.

On November 9, 2021, Q-Games announced that they had acquired the IP to The Tomorrow Children from Sony Interactive Entertainment and intended to "rebuild" and relaunch the game at a later date. This was an unprecedented move, as SIE had previously expressed disapproval towards the idea of selling their IPs.

The game was re-released in 2022 as The Tomorrow Children: Phoenix Edition. Its dependence on a central server and microtransactions were removed in order to ensure it would remain playable offline. The new release is no longer free-to-play.

== Reception ==
Reception

Aggregate score
Aggregator	Score
Metacritic	54/100

Review scores
Publication	Score
GameSpot	3/10
IGN	5.2/10
Push Square	6/10

The Tomorrow Children received mixed or average reviews, according to review aggregator platform Metacritic.

Since its discontinuation, The Tomorrow Children has been recognised as being ahead of its time due to its art style, graphics and lighting.
