= Metropolis light transport =

Application of the Metropolis–Hastings algorithm to image rendering

Metropolis light transport (MLT) is a global illumination application of a Monte Carlo method called the Metropolis–Hastings algorithm to the rendering equation for generating images from detailed physical descriptions of three-dimensional scenes.

The procedure constructs paths from the eye to a light source using bidirectional path tracing, then constructs slight modifications to the path. Some careful statistical calculation (the Metropolis algorithm) is used to compute the appropriate distribution of brightness over the image. This procedure has the advantage, relative to bidirectional path tracing, that once a path has been found from light to eye, the algorithm can then explore nearby paths; thus difficult-to-find light paths can be explored more thoroughly with the same number of simulated photons. In short, the algorithm generates a path and stores the path's 'nodes' in a list. It can then modify the path by adding extra nodes and creating a new light path. While creating this new path, the algorithm decides how many new 'nodes' to add and whether or not these new nodes will actually create a new path.

Metropolis light transport is an unbiased method that, in some cases (but not always), converges to a solution of the rendering equation faster than other unbiased algorithms such as path tracing or bidirectional path tracing.

Energy Redistribution Path Tracing (ERPT) uses Metropolis sampling-like mutation strategies instead of an intermediate probability distribution step. In 2002, Kelemen et al. introduced Primary Sample Space Metropolis Light Transport (PSSMLT), which perturbs the pseudo-random-number inputs used to generate paths rather than mutating path space directly, making it simpler to implement but sacrificing some of the original method's specialized path-space mutations.

== See also ==
- Nicholas Metropolis – The physicist after whom the algorithm is named

Renderers using MLT:

- Arion – A commercial unbiased renderer based on path tracing and providing an MLT sampler
- Nvidia Iray (external link) – An unbiased renderer that has an option for MLT
- Kerkythea – A free unbiased 3D renderer that uses MLT
- LuxCoreRender – An open source unbiased renderer that uses MLT
- Mitsuba Renderer (web site) A research-oriented renderer which implements several MLT variants
- Octane Render – A commercial unbiased renderer that uses MLT
- Indigo Renderer (web site) – An unbiased, photorealistic GPU and CPU renderer that supports MLT
