= Caustic (optics) =

Envelope of light rays reflected or refracted by a curved surface/object

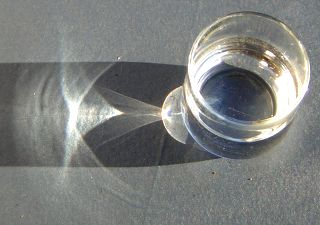
Caustics from a glass of water

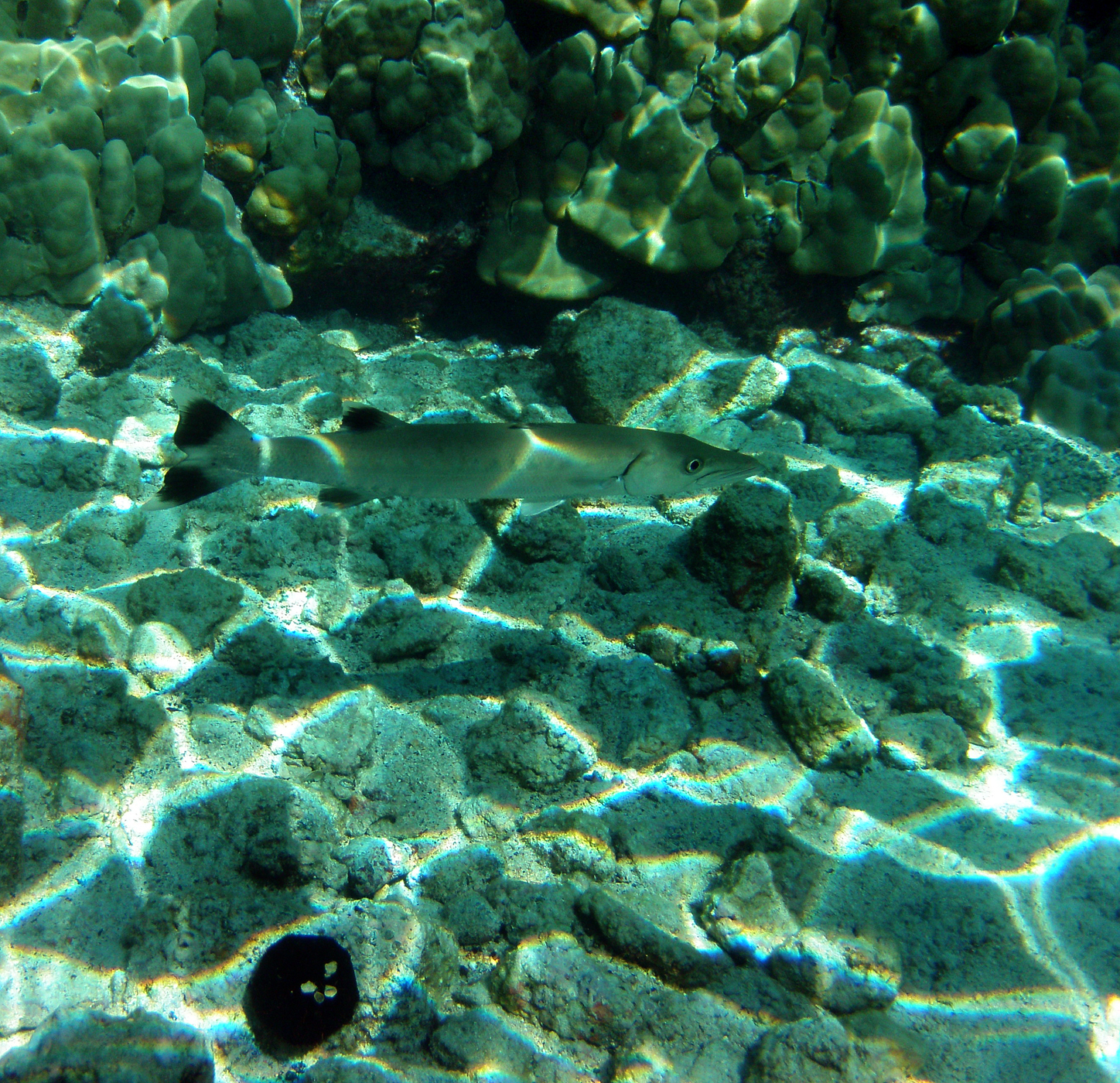
Caustics made by the surface of water

In optics, a caustic or caustic network is the envelope of light rays which have been reflected or refracted by a curved surface or object, or the projection of that envelope of rays on another surface. The caustic is a curve or surface to which each of the light rays is tangent, defining a boundary of an envelope of rays as a curve of concentrated light. In some cases caustics can be seen as patches of light or their bright edges, shapes which often have cusp singularities.

== Explanation ==
Rays refracted by an irregular surface form caustics where many of them cross

Concentration of light, especially sunlight, can burn. The word caustic, in fact, comes from the Greek καυστός, burnt, via the Latin causticus, burning.

A common situation where caustics are visible is when light shines on a drinking glass. The glass casts a shadow, but also produces a curved region of bright light. In ideal circumstances (including perfectly parallel rays, as if from a point source at infinity), a nephroid-shaped patch of light can be produced. Rippling caustics are commonly formed when light shines through waves on a body of water.

Another familiar caustic is the rainbow. Scattering of light by raindrops causes different wavelengths of light to be refracted into arcs of differing radius, producing the bow.

== Computer graphics ==
Computer rendering of a wine glass caustic

In computer graphics, most modern rendering systems support caustics. Some of them even support volumetric caustics. This is accomplished by raytracing the possible paths of a light beam, accounting for the refraction and reflection. Photon mapping is one implementation of this. Volumetric caustics can also be achieved by volumetric path tracing. Some computer graphic systems work by "forward ray tracing" wherein photons are modeled as coming from a light source and bouncing around the environment according to rules. Caustics are formed in the regions where sufficient photons strike a surface causing it to be brighter than the average area in the scene. “Backward ray tracing” works in the reverse manner beginning at the surface and determining if there is a direct path to the light source. Some examples of 3D ray-traced caustics can be found here.

The focus of most computer graphics systems is aesthetics rather than physical accuracy. This is especially true when it comes to real-time graphics in computer games where generic pre-calculated textures are mostly used instead of physically correct calculations.

== Caustic engineering ==
Caustic engineering describes the process of solving the inverse problem to computer graphics. That is, given a specific image, to determine a surface whose refracted or reflected light forms this image.

In the discrete version of this problem, the surface is divided into several micro-surfaces which are assumed smooth, i.e. the light reflected/refracted by each micro-surface forms a Gaussian caustic. Gaussian caustic means that each micro-surface obey Gaussian distribution. The position and orientation of each of the micro-surfaces are then obtained using a combination of Poisson integration and simulated annealing.

There have been many different approaches to address the continuous problem. One approach uses an idea from transportation theory called optimal transport to find a mapping between incoming light rays and the target surface. After obtaining such a mapping, the surface is optimized by adapting it iteratively using Snell's law of refraction.

=== Optimal-transport-based caustic pattern design ===
==== Basic principle ====
Controlling caustic pattern is rather a challenging problem as very minor changes of the surface will significantly affect the quality of the pattern since light ray directions might be interfered by other light rays as they intersect with and refract through the material. This will lead to a scattered, discontinuous pattern. To tackle this problem, optimal-transport-based is one of the existing proposed methods to control caustic pattern by redirecting light's directions as it propagates through the surface of a certain transparent material. This is done by solving an inverse optimization problem based on optimal transport. Given a reference image of an object/pattern, the target is to formulate the mathematical description of the material surface through which light refracts and converges to the similar pattern of the reference image. This is done by rearranging/recomputing the initial light intensity until the minimum of the optimization problem is reached.

=== Manufacturing ===
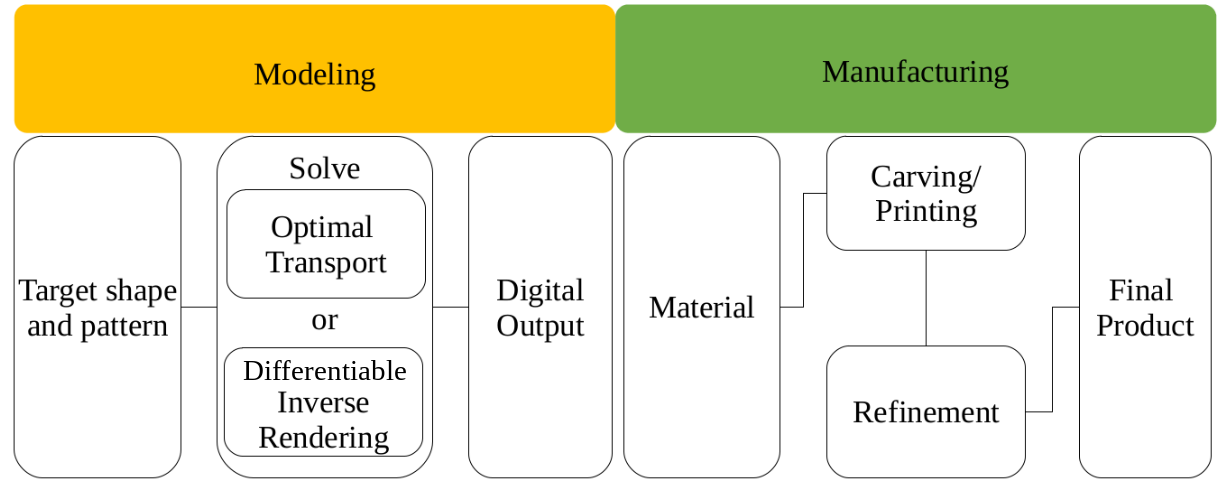
Design and manufacturing process

Once the caustic pattern has been designed computationally, the processed data will be then sent to the manufacturing stage to get the final product. The most common approach is subtractive manufacturing (machining).

Various materials can be used depending on the desired quality, the effort it takes to manufacture, and the available manufacturing method.

- Common refractive materials: acrylic, polycarbonate, polyethylene, glass, diamond
- Common reflective materials: steel, iron, aluminum, gold, silver, titanium, nickel

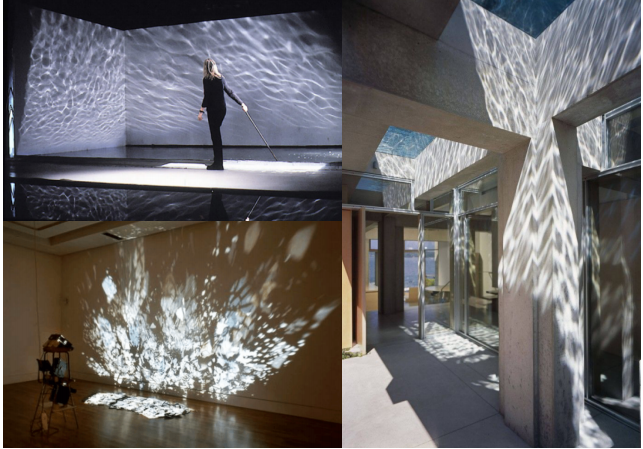
Architecture

Caustic pattern design has many real-world applications, for example in:

- Luminaires
- Jewelry
- Architecture
- Decorative glass production

== See also ==
- Caustic (mathematics)
- Circle of confusion
- Focus (optics)
- Keller cone
