= Silicon Fen =

Name given to hi-tech businesses in Cambridge, England

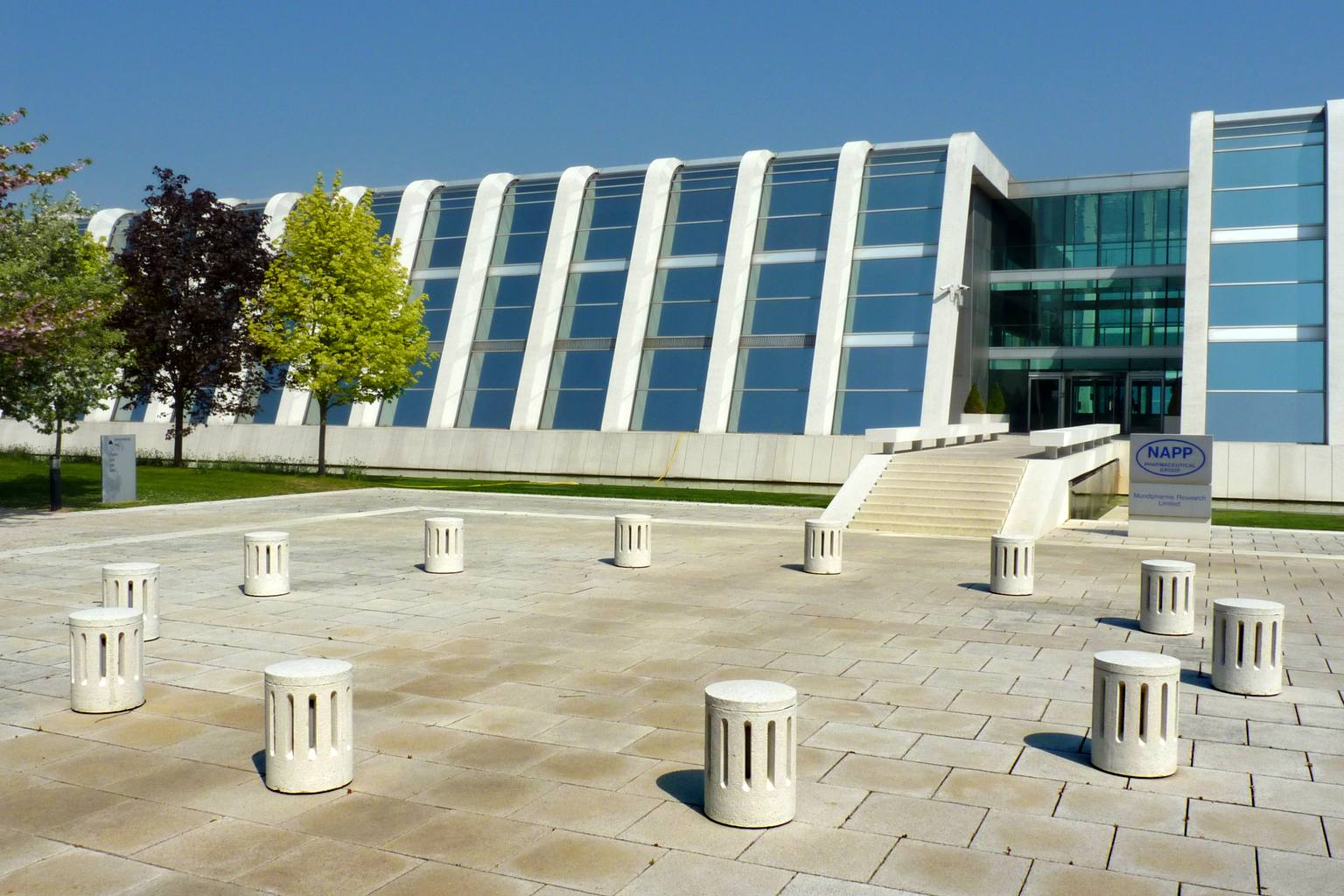
Cambridge Science Park

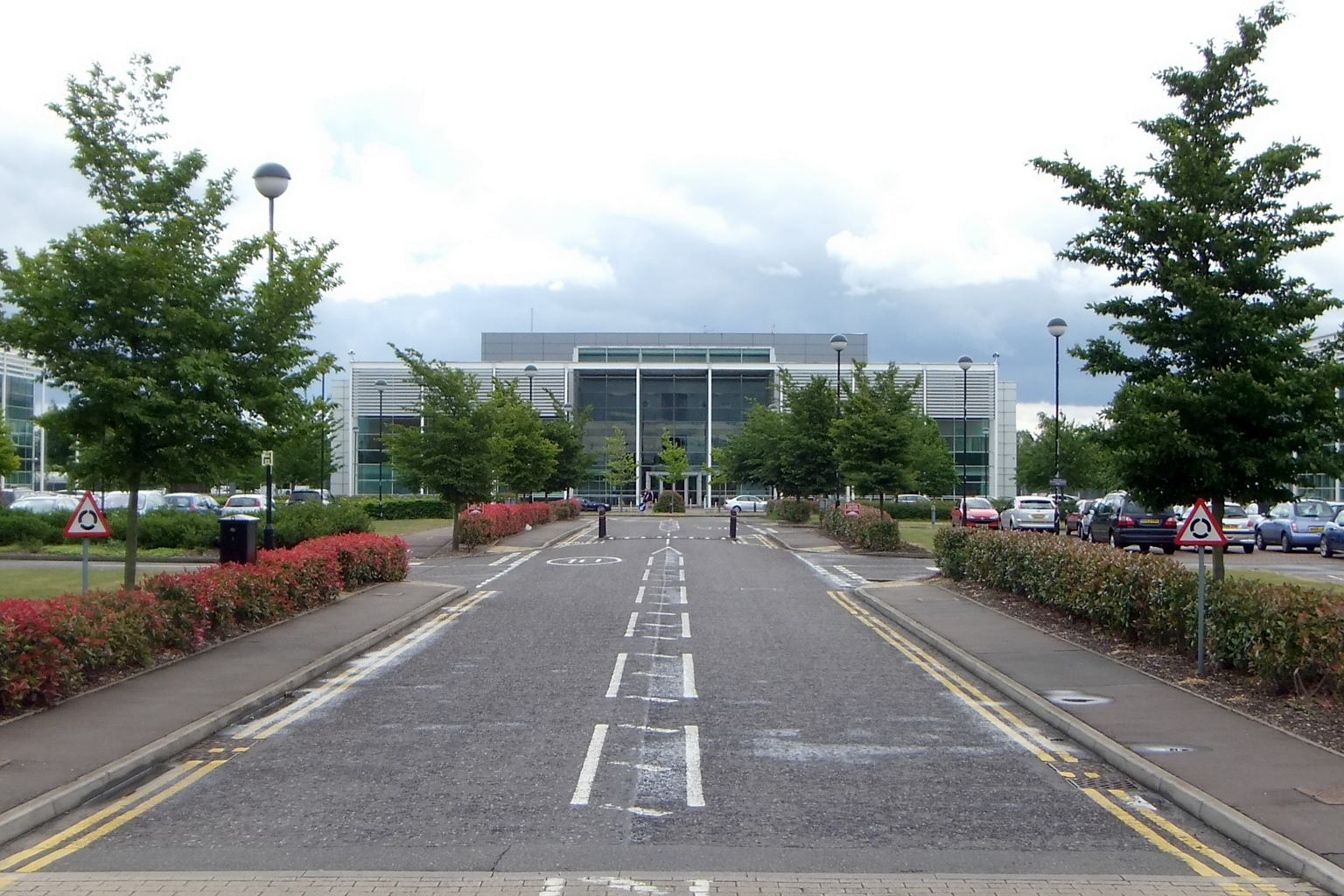
Cambridge Business Park

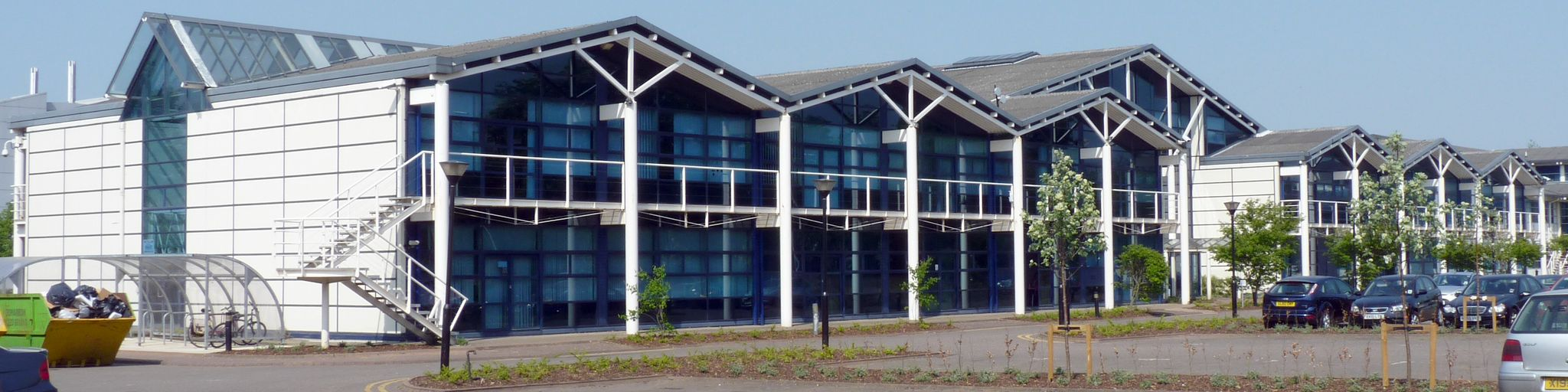
St John's Innovation Centre

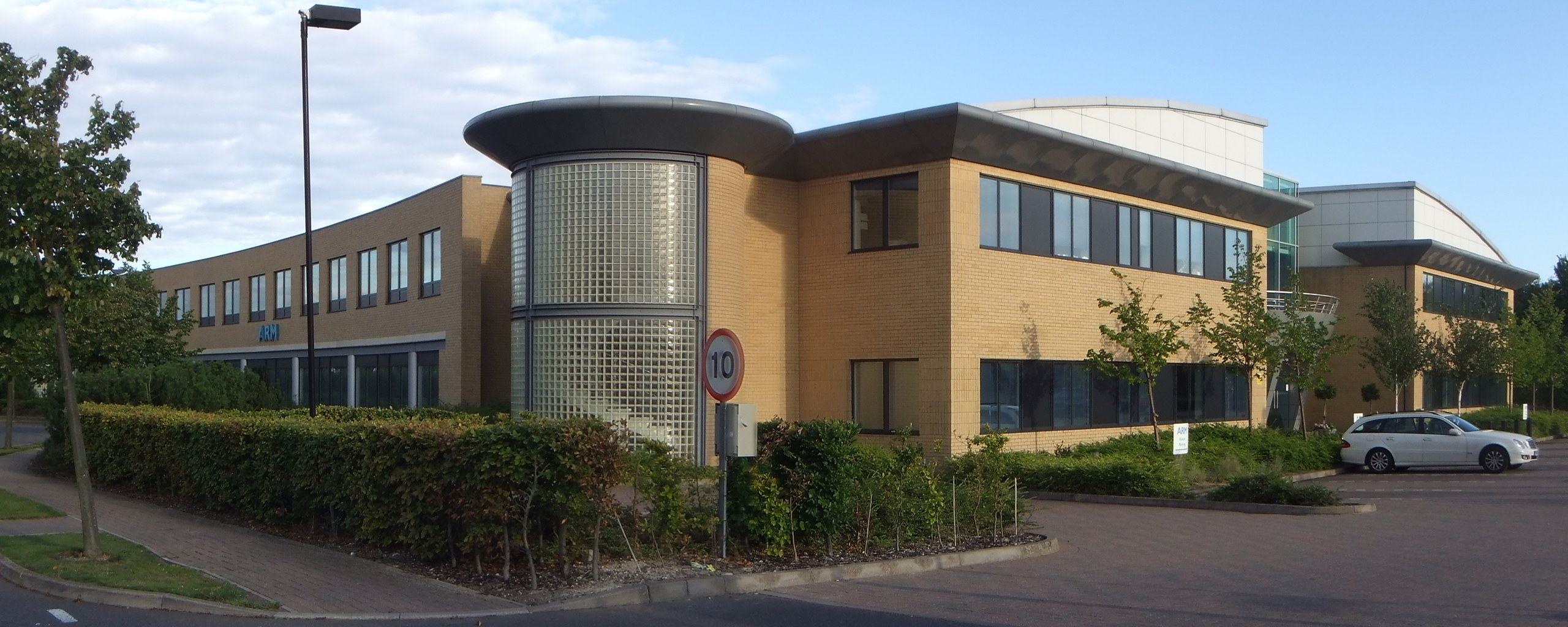
Peterhouse Technology Park

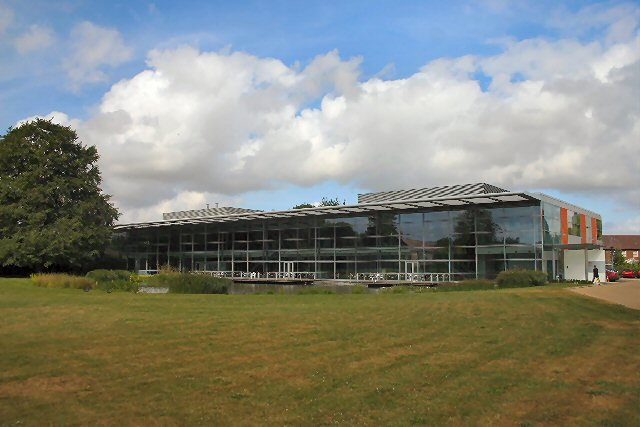
Melbourn Science Park

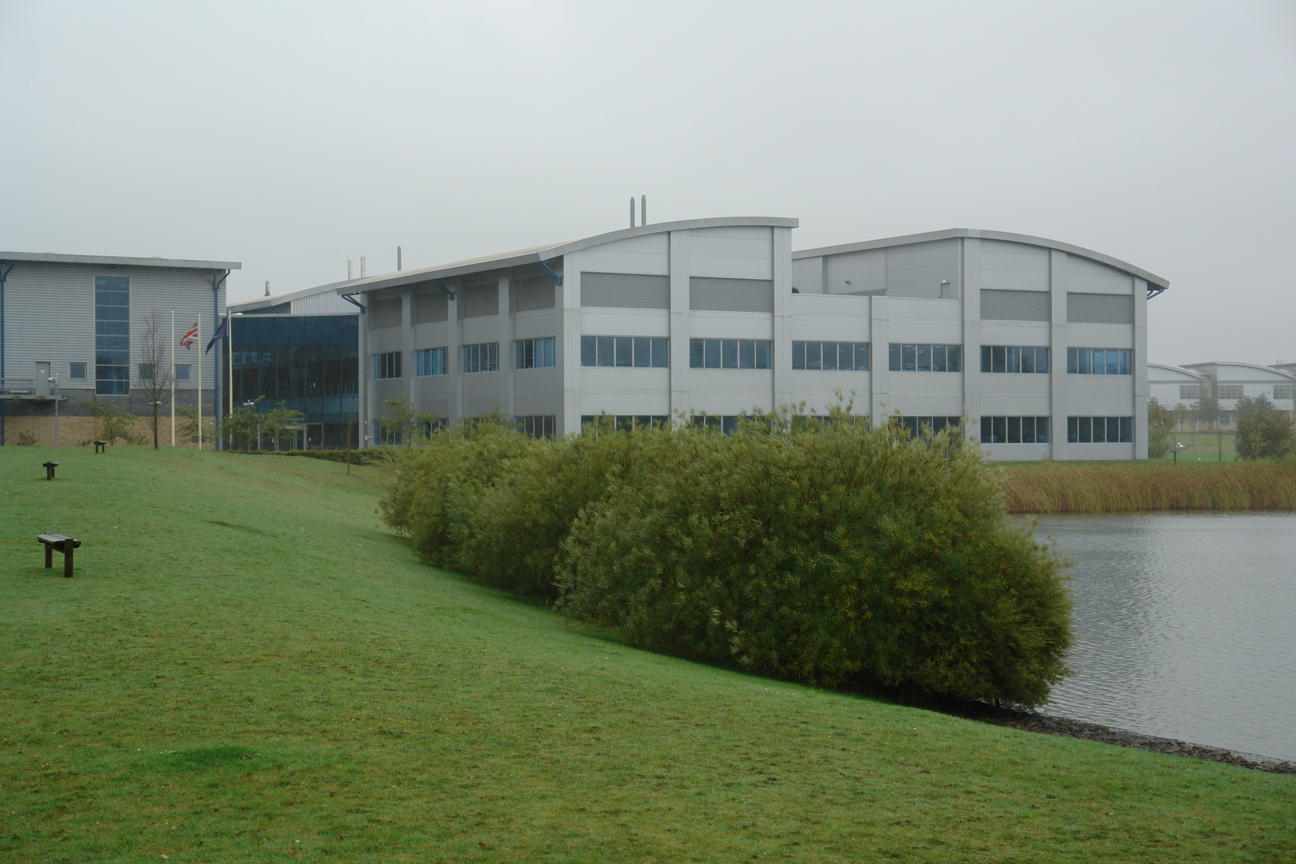
Granta Park

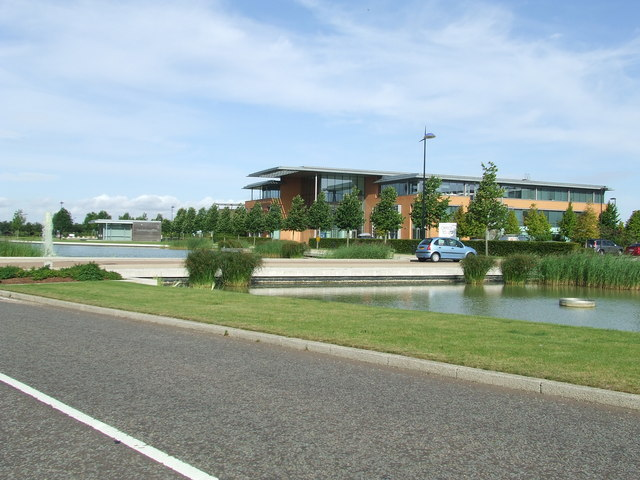
Cambourne Business Park

Silicon Fen or the Cambridge Cluster is a collective name given to high tech businesses focused on software, electronics, and biotechnology, including Arm and AstraZeneca, in and around the city of Cambridge in England.

The name Silicon Fen originated as an analogy with Silicon Valley in California because Cambridge lies at the southern tip of the Fens. The local growth in technology companies started with Sinclair Research and Acorn Computers.

== Business growth ==
More than 1,000 high-technology companies established offices in the area during the five years preceding 1998. Some early successful businesses were Advanced RISC Machines and Cambridge Display Technology. In 2004, 24% of all UK venture capital, representing 8% of all venture capital in the European Union, was received by Silicon Fen companies, according to the Cambridge Cluster Report 2004 produced by Library House and Grant Thornton.

The so-called Cambridge phenomenon, which gave rise to start-up companies in a town that previously had only light industry in the electrical sector, is usually dated to the founding of the Cambridge Science Park in 1970 as an initiative of Trinity College at the University of Cambridge.

The characteristic of Cambridge is small companies in sectors such as computer-aided design. They are spread over an area defined by the CB postcode or 01223 telephone area code, or more generously in an area bounded by Ely, Newmarket, Saffron Walden, Royston, and Huntingdon.

In 2000, then Chancellor of the Exchequer Gordon Brown set up a research partnership between MIT and Cambridge University, the Cambridge–MIT Institute, in order to increase international collaboration between the two universities and strengthen the economic success of Silicon Fen.

In February 2006, Cambridge Judge Business School reported estimates that there were approximately 250 active start-ups directly linked to the university, valued at roughly US$6 billion. Several of these companies have grown into multinationals, including Arm, Autonomy Corporation, AVEVA, and Cambridge Silicon Radio.

In 2012, it was reported that strong employment growth in the Silicon Fen hub was hampered due to its significant concentration on research and development, which was limiting competition in manufacturing and costs.

Cambridge Ahead, the business and academic membership organisation dedicated to the long-term growth of the city and its region, reported in 2015–16, that growth of Cambridge companies was approximately 7% over one, three, and five-year durations. Global turnover of Cambridge companies increased by 7.6% to £35.7bn, up from £33bn the previous year, and global employment grew by 7.6% to 210,292. The number of companies headquartered within 20 miles of Cambridge grew from 22,017 to 24,580.

Silicon Fen, the high-tech cluster surrounding the University of Cambridge, demonstrates strong university–industry collaboration, particularly in the Pharma/Biotech sector, which accounts for most joint patents and the highest technological collaboration strength. Patent analysis (1999–2021) shows that university spin-offs drive these partnerships. Further analysis reveals that smaller and older firms collaborate more closely with the university and engage more female inventors. Promoting inclusion and collaboration beyond Pharma/Biotech could enhance innovation and regional technological development.

== Area characteristics ==
The Cambridge Network is an organization facilitating networking in the area.

Other possible factors include a high standard of living available in the county, and good transport links, for example to London and with Cambridge Airport having a full service business jet centre. Many graduates from the university choose to stay on in the area, giving local companies a rich pool of talent to draw upon. The high-technology industry has little by way of competition, unlike say in Oxfordshire where many other competing industries exist. Cambridgeshire has only recently become a high-technology centre, which has meant that commercial rents were generally lower than in other parts of the UK and thus giving companies a head-start on those situated in other more expensive regions. However, the recent technology boom has changed the situation and Cambridgeshire now ranks as one of the highest costs of living in the UK outside London, which is home to an even bigger technology centre.

== People and companies associated with Silicon Fen ==
=== People ===
- David Cleevely
- Sherry Coutu
- Hermann Hauser
- Andy Hopper
- Ewan Kirk
- Dick Newell
- Clive Sinclair

=== Companies ===
- Abcam
- Acorn Computers
- Adder Technology
- Aixtron
- Arm
- Aveva
- Broadcom Inc.
- Cambridge Broadband
- Cambridge Consultants
- Cambridge Interactive Systems Ltd
- Cambridge Network
- Cambridge Semiconductor Limited
- Cambridge Silicon Age Centre for Innovation Limited
- Camcon Technology
- Cantab Capital Partners
- CSR plc
- DANTE
- Darktrace
- DisplayLink
- Docker, Inc.
- Endomag
- Frontier Developments
- Global Silicon
- ip.access
- Jagex
- PA Consulting Group
- Raspberry Pi Foundation
- RealVNC
- RISC OS Open
- Sinclair Research
- ST Robotics
- Team Consulting

== See also ==
- Silicon Valley
- List of places with 'Silicon' names
- List of city nicknames in the United Kingdom
- Oxford-Cambridge Arc

== Sources ==
- The Cambridge Cluster Report 2007, Library House 2007, Download
- The Cambridge Phenomenon: The Growth of High Technology Industry in a University Town, Segal Quince & Partners 1985, ISBN 0-9510202-0-X
- Worthington, Tom (1999). "The Cambridge Phenomenon: Summary of The Report". Net traveller: exploring the networked nation. Australian Computer Society. ISBN 0-909925-74-7.
- The Cambridge Phenomenon Revisited – a synopsis of the new report by Segal Quince Wicksteed, Segal Quince & Partners 2000, Download
- The Cambridge Cluster Report 2003, Library House 2003, Download
- The Cambridge Cluster Report 2004, Library House in association with Grant Thornton 2004, Download
- The Cambridge Cluster Report 2006, Library House 2006, Download
- The Cambridge Technopole Report 2006 An overview of the UK's leading high tech cluster, St John's Innovation Centre 2006,
- The Impact of the University of Cambridge on the UK Economy and Society A high-level study commissioned by EEDA and the Cambridge Network in 2006,
- INSIGHTS & RESEARCH | WHAT IS SILICON FEN? bidwells.co.uk,
