= MPDS4 =

M4 Plant (MPDS4 in past)
- Developer(s): CAD Schroer
- Initial release: 2006
- Stable release: 7.1 / 2022
- Operating system: MS Windows
- Available in: Eng, Ger, It, Fr
- Type: Computer-aided design
- License: Proprietary
- Website: http://www.cad-schroer.com/

MPDS, the MEDUSA Plant Design System ( MPDS4 since 2006 then now M4 PLANT), is a suite of plant engineering applications for 2D/3D layout, design, and modeling of process plants, factories, or installations. The system's history is closely tied to the very beginnings of mainstream CAD and the research culture fostered by Cambridge University and the UK government including the resulting "Cambridge Phenomenon " MPDS was initially developed for 3D plant design and layout and piping design. Today, the software includes modules for 2D/3D factory layout, process, instrumentation diagrams (P&ID), mechanical handling systems design, steel design, ducting (HVAC) design, electrical design, and hangers and supports Design. The latest version, M4 PLANT 7.1, was released for Microsoft Windows in 2022.

== History ==
MPDS’ history is tied in with the Computer-Aided Design Centre (or CAD Centre) which was created in Cambridge in 1967 by the UK Government to carry out CAD research.

Famous British computer scientist Dr. Dick Newell worked there on a file-based macro language-driven 3D plant design system called PDMS (Plant Design Management System). With colleague Tom Sancha, he left the CAD Centre in 1977 to form a company called Cambridge Interactive Systems or CIS, and primarily concentrated on 2D CAD. CIS had developed an electrical cabling solution initially called CABLOS, which Dowty Engineering first purchased in about 1979. Another early adopter was BMW, which used the system for car wiring diagrams. CABLOS soon became known and sold as the MEDUSA drafting system under CIS. The proprietary programming language with which MEDUSA version 1 was developed was known as baCIS 1. Around this time, the company also began developing its own 3D modeling kernel for MEDUSA.

Around 1980, CIS partnered with Prime Computer, a U.S.-based computer hardware provider. Prime had an option on the MEDUSA source code should CIS ever fail. In 1983 the U.S. CAD company ComputerVision purchased CIS.

ComputerVision/CIS started developing the MEDUSA Plant Design System (MPDS), the first plant design software based on a relational database. Developers knew from their prior experience with a file-based macro-language driven system that the next generation plant design system had to be built on a relational database and with a much more powerful programming language to handle large data volumes, complexity and relationships. Whereas mechanical CAD engineers were developing machinery with a few hundred or maybe a thousand components, plant design engineers typically needed to deal with hundreds of thousands of components. To facilitate this work, the baCIS 2 interpretive language and the MDB relational database were developed for MPDS. Existing MEDUSA technology was used to create the 2D and 3D geometric data required for plant layouts. The creation of this data-centric concept separated the 3D visualization of a plant from the underlying database and allowed engineers to plan and design installations with very large volumes of data, and produce all the required 2D drawings from 3D plant designs.

The first MPDS sales date to around 1988 to NEI Parsons (Northern Engineering Industries later became part of the Rolls-Royce Industrial Power Group). Courtaulds Engineering, which had been using MEDUSA since 1983, was also an early MPDS adopter.

In the same year Prime Computer merged with ComputerVision and adopted the name ComputerVision to concentrate on software, due to declining hardware sales. MEDUSA continued to be developed throughout the 1990s in Cambridge, UK at ComputerVision's R&D Centre at Harston Mill.

In 1993, the next generation of MEDUSA and MPDS was released. What would have been version 13 was released as MEDUSA NG and MPDS NG. They signified the shift from tablet-driven menus to a graphical user interface, although tablets could still be used on that release.

In 1994 ComputerVision closed its R&D facility in Cambridge, moving to Boston, Massachusetts. As a result, five former ComputerVision staff members and MEDUSA experts formed the company Quintic Ltd in Cambridge, which continued to provide MEDUSA and MPDS development and consultancy services to ComputerVision and the MEDUSA customer base. Work included the porting of MEDUSA NG to Microsoft Windows.

Note: The above doesn't quite work. According to Companies House, Quintic Ltd was not actually formed until 27th February 2013, 19 years after the Cambridge R&D facility closed.

In 1998 the American CAD company Parametric Technology Corporation (PTC) acquired ComputerVision. The development partnership between Quintic and ComputerVision transferred to PTC.

The largest MEDUSA user base was in the heavily, manufacturing-driven, economy of Germany. CAD Schroer, a company founded in 1986 by Michael Schroer as a provider of CAD-based engineering services, became a MEDUSA vendor in 1988, having used the software extensively on client projects. The company, which also provided add-on modules and customizations, had established a development relationship first with ComputerVision, then with PTC.

In 2001, CAD Schroer acquired all rights to MEDUSA and MPDS from PTC. The development partnership between Quintic and CAD Schroer strengthened, as the two companies worked to create a Fourth Generation release of MEDUSA and MPDS. This included a complete overhaul of the functionality; the development of a graphical user interface (GUI) based on the Qt (framework) technology, the development of data exchange mechanisms and interfaces with third party systems, and the porting to the Linux open-source operating system.

In 2005, CAD Schroer acquired its development partner Quintic Ltd, gaining CAD development expertise that dates back to the days of CIS and Prime. CAD Schroer UK remains a software development center in Cambridge, whose staff continue to develop and support MEDUSA4 and MPDS4 in partnership with CAD development experts at CAD Schroer GmbH in Moers, Germany.

In 2006, CAD Schroer released the Fourth Generation of the MPDS plant design system, MPDS4. Since then the company has continued to develop and extend the functionality of the product suite, including the development of a factory layout module for designing 3D factories based on 2D drawings.

== Technical Description ==
=== Database Architecture ===
Multi-user engineering design in MPDS is relational database-driven. The project database can be deployed as a central design database or as a project-specific database and contains component catalogs with assigned component attributes. The database drives the design graphics as well as user administration and can be integrated with other database-driven systems, such as Enterprise Resource Planning (ERP) system.

=== 3D Graphics ===
MPDS combines use of the HOOPS 3D Graphics System with the relational database, whose catalog component attributes define the visual representation of each component. Because 3D plant models can be generated from catalog-based drawing routines, the demand on computer memory and resources is limited. Plants of hundreds of thousands of components can be designed, edited and exported to a compact .HSF format for external visual review. The system support varying display detail levels, allowing designers to visualize components either in great detail, visually simplified, or merely as an outline object in space, required for effective clash detection.

=== User Administration ===
Central user administration and access controls in MPDS allow Administrators to set up a variety of users who can work on a plant design simultaneously, and who can have different access privileges - limited, for example, to certain design disciplines or to certain areas within a plant. This is supported by integrated version and change management.

=== Quality Assurance ===
MPDS4 includes hard and soft clash detection, which can be applied to a whole project, to separate systems or between selected components. Consistency checking tools allow users to check work against specific design rules. Results can be passed to customizable reports, and components used in a design are automatically included in parts lists.

== Modules ==
The MPDS4 Assembly Manager is at the core of the plant design and factory layout system, and can be extended with several user extensible and customizable modules covering plant engineering disciplines.

The MPDS4 Piping Design module delivers automated piping isometrics

PIPING DESIGN
MPDS4 PIPING DESIGN is an industrial piping design software add-on with extensive libraries of catalogue components to a variety of industrial standards, including DIN, ANSI and BS. Its routing tools are used for loading, positioning and replacing components, manually or automatically. The module supports P&ID-driven piping design and is pipe specification driven, so that only components from the same specification can be connected. MPDS4 PIPING DESIGN is fully integrated with ISOGEN (from ALIAS Piping Solutions) for automated piping isometric production.

P&ID
P&ID is an application for creating intelligent process and instrumentation diagrams; for data extraction, and for use of data to create and cross-check the 3D world. Design can be database-driven and based on existing parts lists. P&ID diagrams can be used to form the basis of 2D layouts and 3D designs, with the ability to cross-check P&IDs and automatically load P&ID components not yet included in a 3D plant design in the appropriate position.

MPDS4 Factory Layout offers a hybrid 2D/3D design environment

FACTORY LAYOUT
MPDS4 FACTORY LAYOUT is a hybrid 2D/3D design environment where 2D layouts or drawings are used as the basis of 3D designs. Height attributes added to 2D building plans are used to produce 3D buildings. Symbols used in a 2D layout are linked to 3D model files which are automatically generated when users switch to 3D. Other components or product specials can be modelled using a sheet-based modelling approach.

MATERIALS HANDLING
MPDS4 MECHANICAL HANDLING is a design application with a series of configurable catalogs of mechanical materials handling components, which can be physically interconnected to form part of an industrial process. It includes catalogs of conveyor belts, cranes, fork lift trucks, industrial racking, and robots, and allows installation designers to select, lay out, configure, visualize and add intelligence to process machinery in a plant. The module also supports the controlled creation of product specials for materials handling.

STEEL DESIGN
MPDS4 STEEL DESIGN is a module for constructing steel frames for buildings and equipment support. MPDS4 STEEL DESIGN includes catalogs of steel sections for many worldwide steel standards and allows users to design steel members, plates, stairs and ladders.

DUCTING DESIGN
MPDS4 DUCTING DESIGN is a software module for routing HVAC, of differing sections, into a plant or factory. MPDS4 DUCTING DESIGN includes catalogs with different types of ducts, valves, fans and other supporting components.

MPDS4 Engineering Review virtual walk-through of an airport

ELECTRICAL DESIGN
MPDS4 ELECTRICAL DESIGN is a design module for routing or connecting electrical systems with components throughout a plant, ship, or factory. The user extensible and customizable catalogs contain many different types of electrical and control systems, as well as cable trays, cable ducts and links, and other supporting components. Auto routing functionality finds the shortest cable route between two designated points. By adding a KVA (kilovolt-ampere) rating to selected components, users can analyze the required power rating of an entire network of connected instances and cables.

HANGERS & SUPPORTS DESIGN
MPDS4 HANGERS & SUPPORTS DESIGN is a design application for accurately modelling supports between pipes and steelwork in a plant or installation.

ENGINEERING REVIEW
MPDS4 ENGINEERING REVIEW is an application for conducting realistic engineering design reviews within the MPDS4 plant environment, visually presenting all of the plant project data. The module contains functionality for sectioning and setting transparency and allows users to define and generate movie-like walkthroughs of an installation.

REVIEW
MPDS4 REVIEW is an external review application for users who do not have the MPDS4 plant design system installed. MPDS4 can generate .HSF (Hoops format) files of a plant design, which can be e-mailed to users of the MPDS4 REVIEW tool. They use the software to conduct interactive design reviews and walk-throughs, or present designs to third parties.

== See also ==
- PDMS
