= PDMS =

PDMS may refer to:

- Palm Desert Middle School, a middle school in Palm Desert, California
- Plant Design Management System
- Plasma desorption mass spectrometry
- Point-Defence Missile System
- Polydimethylsiloxane, a silicon-based organic polymer
