= PDMS (software) =

CAD software

- Developer: AVEVA
- Release: 1974
- Stable release: 12.1 SP5 / June 2020
- Operating system: Windows
- Type: CAD
- License: Proprietary software

PDMS (Plant Design Management System) as it is known in the 3D CAD industry, is a customizable, multi-user and multi-discipline, engineer controlled design software package for engineering, design and construction projects in offshore and onshore.

The Computer-Aided Design Centre (or CADCentre as it was more commonly referred to, and later formally became) was created in Cambridge, England, UK in 1967 by the UK Ministry of Technology. Its mission was to develop computer-aided design techniques and promote their take-up by British industry. The centre carried out much pioneering CAD research, and many of its early staff members went on to become prominent in the worldwide CAD community, such as brothers Dick Newell and Martin Newell.

Dick Newell oversaw the creation of the Plant Design Management System (PDMS) for 3D process plant design. He later co-founded two software companies – Cambridge Interactive Systems (CIS) which was known for its Medusa 2D/3D CAD system, and Smallworld with its eponymous Smallworld GIS (Geographical Information System). Martin Newell later went to the University of Utah where he did pioneering 3D solid modelling work; he was also one of the progenitors of PostScript.

Subsequently, the UK government, via the British Technology Group (BTG) established a separate company, Compeda Ltd, to exploit software developed and owned by the government and they took over the marketing and user support of PDMS, while the software continued to be developed by the CADCentre, with funding from Compeda.

When the UK government decided to privatise (sell) anything that did not need to be government owned, Compeda Ltd was sold to Prime Computer Inc. for a net negative sum of money. Prime Computer decided that PDMS had no commercial value or future and returned the marketing rights for the product to CADCentre.

CADCentre was privatised and in 2001 changed its name to AVEVA.

The latest release, as of March 2021, is AVEVA PDMS 12.1.SP5

AVEVA's legacy Plant Design Management System (PDMS) has been succeeded by AVEVA E3D Design (originally released as AVEVA Everything3D). Following the widely used 2.1 version, the platform transitioned to the 3.1.x release cycle. In newer iterations, the standalone software has been integrated into the broader AVEVA Unified Engineering suite.

== User Groups ==
=== Existing ===
Name	URL	Date Started	Members
AVEVA World Forum	http://www.avevaworldforum.com	2006	17.933
3D Cad PDMS : PDMS Tutorials	http://www.3dcad-pdms.com	2016	NA
PDMSMacro	http://www.pdmsmacro.com (closed)	2013	NA
PDMSMAX	http://pdmsmax.free.fr (offline)	2008	10
Communauté PDMS	http://forumpdms.superforum.fr	2008	555
Club d'Utilisateur Francophone de PDMS CUF-PDMS	http://www.cuf-pdms.org	2009	230
PDMS.INFO	http://www.pdms.info/	2017	NA

=== Defunct ===
Name	URL	Date Started	Date Ended	Members
CADarena	http://www.cadarena.com (closed)	2000	2004	1500
PDMS Forum	http://www.pdmsforum.com (closed)	2005	2007.11	NA
PML Guru (AVEVA PDMS PML)	https://web.archive.org/web/20110208031247/http://pmlguru.com/	2010	?	NA
Viewpoint Americas	https://web.archive.org/web/20061208104916/http://www.viewpointamericas.com/	?	?	NA
ALIPERSIA	http://www.alipersia.com	?	?	

== See also ==
- MPDS4
