= Cambridge Science Centre =

Science museum in Cambridge, England

Coordinates: 52°12′31″N 0°07′14″E

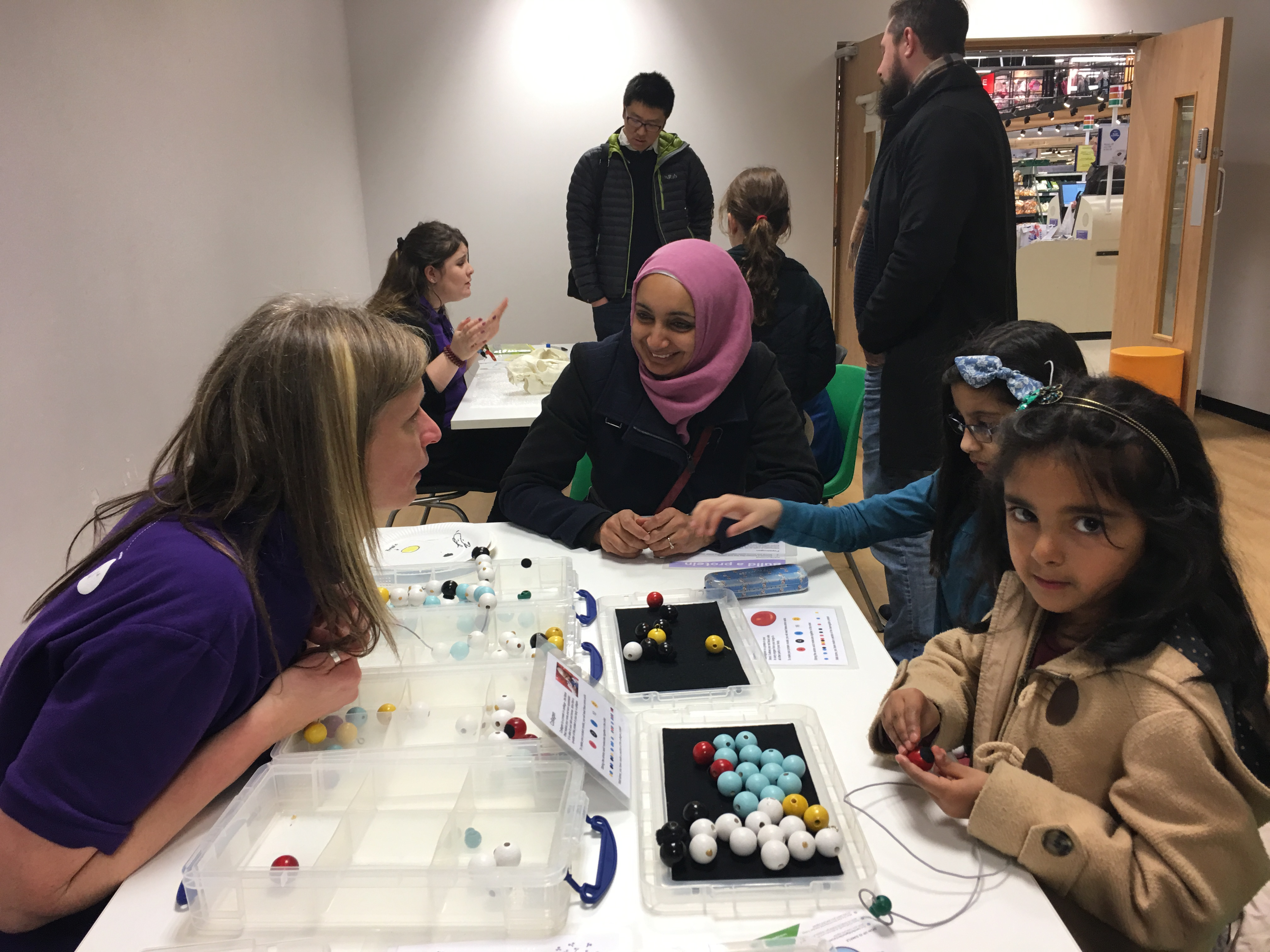
Free pop up science activities at Tesco Bar Hill as part of Street Science

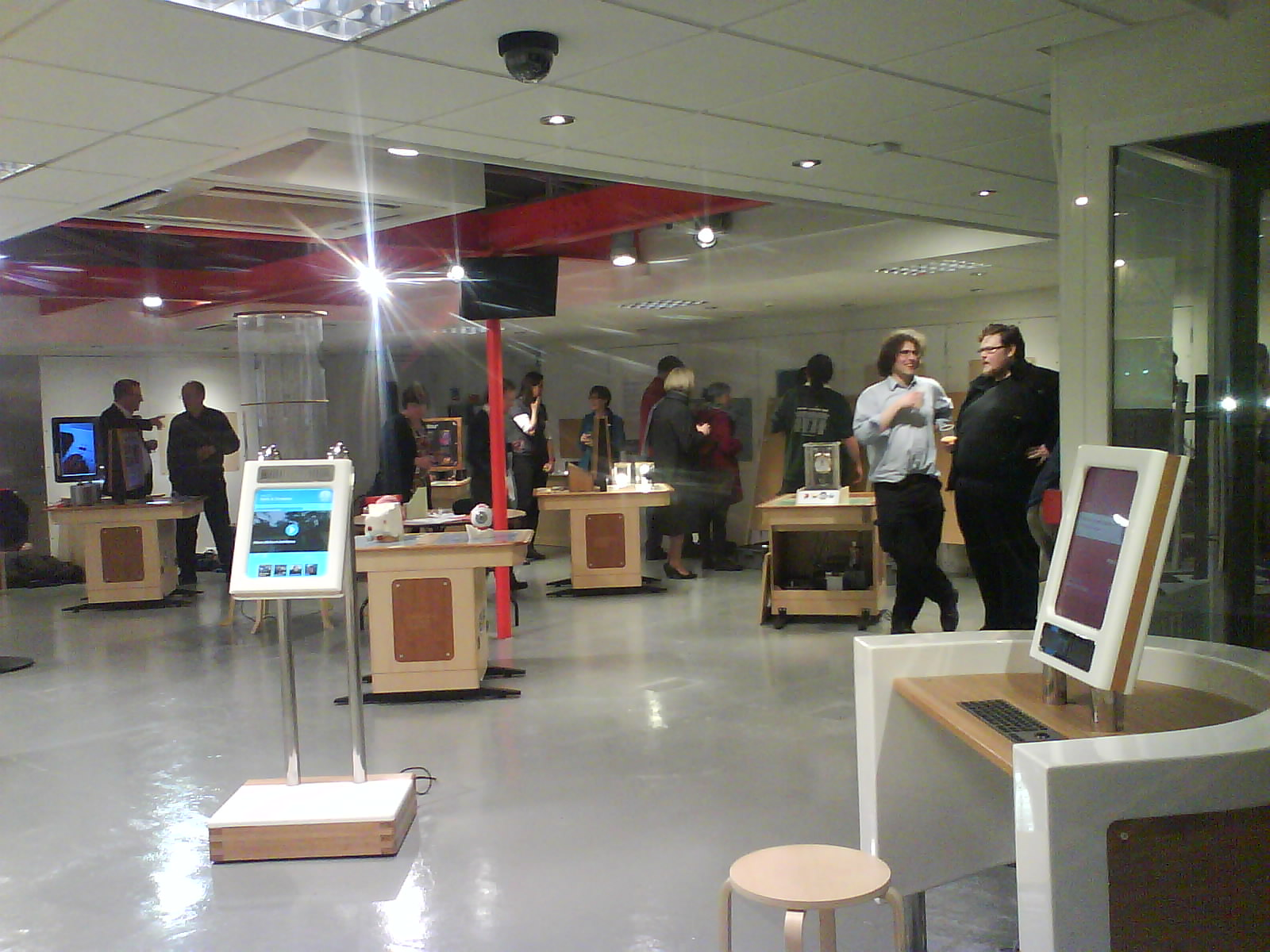
The interior in January 2013.

Cambridge Science Centre, initially located on Jesus Lane in Cambridge, England, is the city's first interactive science museum. The start-up exhibition space was opened by the Vice-Chancellor of Cambridge University, Leszek Borysiewicz, on 7 February 2013, the museum was opened to the public on 8 February 2013. Its first exhibition dealt with the electromagnetic spectrum and principles of sound and hearing. The museum was founded by Dr. Chris Lennard and Dr. Katia Smith-Litiere, backed by technology entrepreneurs, including chairman David Cleevely, Hermann Hauser and Jonathan Milner.

In December 2016, the exhibition space was closed for relocation. While they were relocating, Cambridge Science Centre put on a series of pop up science events known as 'Street Science'. The museum reopened in April 2018.

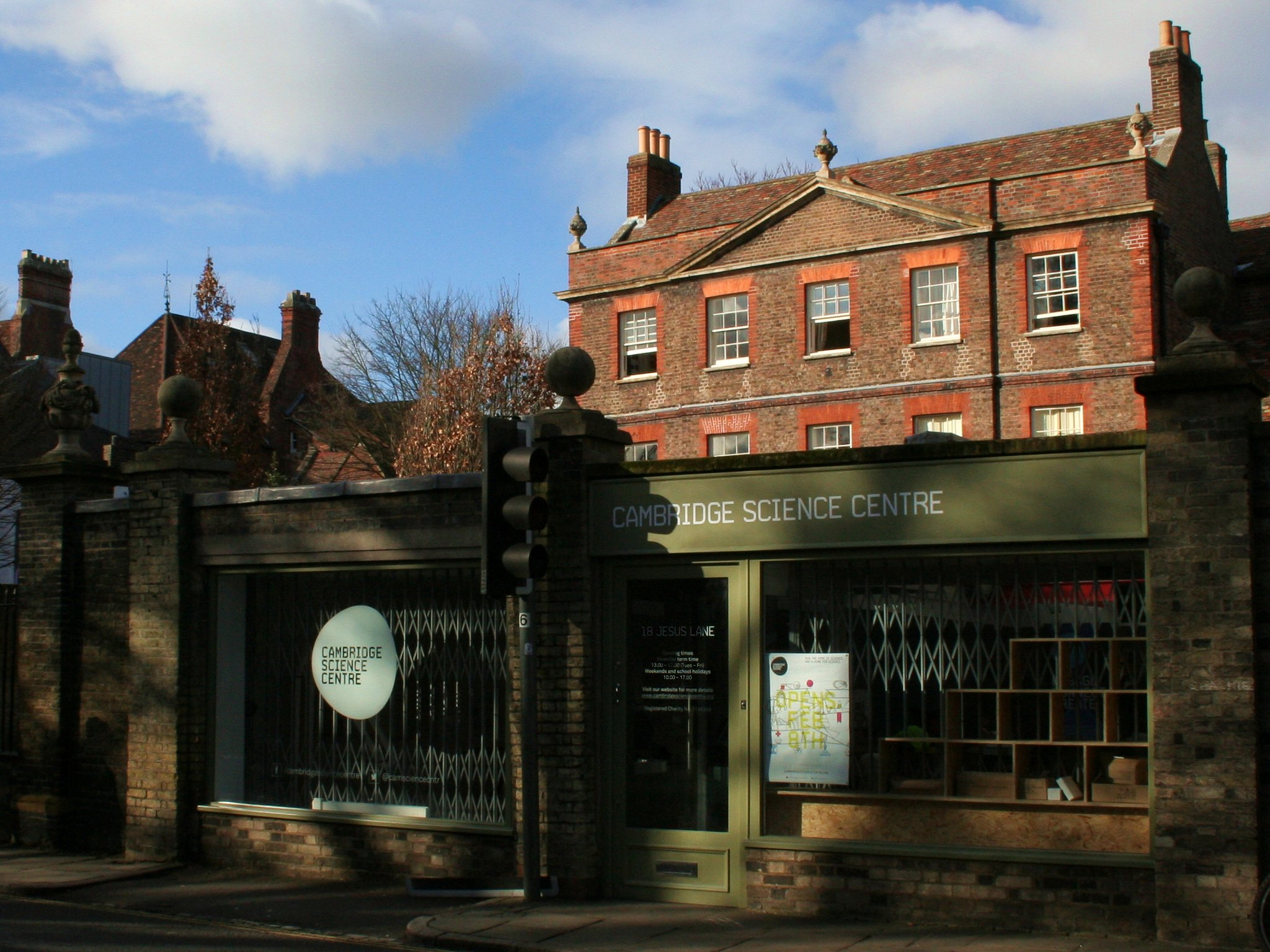
Cambridge Science Centre's first exhibition space 2013 – 2016

== See also ==
- List of science centers#Europe
