= Ashlar-Vellum =

American software company

Vellum Investment Partners, LLC
- Trade name: Ashlar-Vellum
- Formerly: Ashlar, Incorporated (1988 - 2008)
- Industry: User interface design for Computer-aided design (CAD) and 3D modeling software
- Founded: 1988; 37 years ago
- Founder: Dr. Martin Newell
- Headquarters: Great Hills Plaza, Austin, Texas, U.S.
- Website: https://ashlar.com/

Vellum Investment Partners, LLC, dba Ashlar-Vellum, is an American software company that develops Computer-aided design (CAD) and 3D modeling software for both the Macintosh and Microsoft Windows platforms. Ashlar-Vellum's interface, designed in 1988 by Dr. Martin Newell and Dan Fitzpatrick, featured an automated Drafting Assistant that found useful points in the geometry and allowed the artist to quickly connect to locations like the "midpoint" or "tangent".

Their original 2D product, Vellum, underwent numerous upgrades and gained 3D surface modelling capabilities over time. This product is now known as Graphite. In 1998 Vellum was joined by Solids, which added full solid modeling support. This product is now known as Cobalt, and is also offered in several sub-versions with different feature sets and price points.

Founded in Sunnyvale, California, Ashlar Incorporated is now headquartered in Austin, Texas, with additional offices in Kyiv, Ukraine.

In response to Russian invasion of Ukraine, Ashlar-Vellum published statement claiming continuous support for Ukrainian Team and asked to support Ukraine by donating to humanitarian and medical aid, and support Ukrainian Military.

== The Designer Elements Product Family ==
The Ashlar-Vellum product family features the Designer Elements including Graphite, Cobalt, Xenon and Argon.

=== Graphite ===
Graphite offers 2D and 3D wireframe drafting.

Graphite is the modern successor to Ashlar's earlier Vellum program, originally released in 1989. Introduced in 2001, Graphite competes with AutoCAD LT and VectorWorks.

=== Cobalt ===
Cobalt is Ashlar-Vellum's top-level product for 3D modeling and CAD on Mac and Windows. It integrates parametric wireframe, freeform surfacing, feature-based solid modeling and photo-realistic rendering all using the Vellum interface. Everything in Cobalt is history-driven with associativity and 2D equation-driven parametrics and constraints. It offers surfacing tools, mold design tools, detailing, and engineering features. Cobalt also includes a library of 149,000 mechanical parts.

Cobalt is the successor to Ashlar's earlier Vellum Solids program released in 1998. Debuted in 2001, Cobalt competes with Solid Edge, SolidWorks, CATIA, NX, and Pro/Engineer.

=== Xenon ===
Xenon is the mid-level product in Ashlar-Vellum's Designer Elements line of 3D modeling and CAD software for product design on Mac and Windows. Xenon's set of tools within the Vellum interface provides integrated 2D/3D sketching, concept development, design visualization, photorealistic rendering, and engineering drawings.

=== Argon ===
Argon's hybrid solid and surface modeling capabilities provide flexibility in shape design combined with data accuracy. This aids data translation and collaboration in the design process. Precision 2D drawings generated directly from the 3D model facilitate manufacturing. Argon is Ashlar-Vellum's entry-level product in their Designer Elements line of 3D modeling and CAD software on Mac and Windows.

== The Vellum Interface ==
=== Drafting Assistant ===
Drafting Assistant automatically keeps track of all the points and parts of the geometry. By brushing over an entity, the Drafting Assistant wakes up the relevant points such as tangent, on, "center", "midpoint", "parallel" or "perpendicular".

=== Associativity & History Tree ===
A feature of Xenon and Cobalt, associativity increases productivity of design iterations by automatically updating all related objects when changes are made to the defining geometry. It also updates the 2D sheet views, preserving any annotations made on the sheets.

A key element of associativity is the history tree which lists features and associations of a model in the order they were created. It facilitates changes to a model because features can be selected and edited instead of portions deleted and rebuilt, as is required with programs that do not contain history. Changes are rippled through the entire model and the 2D drawing sheets using associativity.

=== Dimensionally-constrained, Equation-driven Parametrics ===
Found in Ashlar-Vellum's Cobalt and Graphite software, parametrics drive the shape of a design by mathematical equations and relationships. They facilitate the creation of part families with varying features. When one dimension changes, others within the model will change or not, according to the equations established to govern those relationships.

== History ==
=== Founding ===
Dr. Martin Newell—the creator of the “Utah teapot” in 1975—founded Ashlar, Incorporated in 1988 with Dan Fitzpatrick in Sunnyvale, California. At Xerox PARC during the 1980s, Dr. Newell researched the interaction between a computer terminal and the computer user contributing to the development of such important tools as the graphical user interface and the computer mouse. After leaving Xerox PARC, Dr. Newell realized his vision of a "heads up" CAD interface, where the user was free to focus on designing without distractions from the application. He developed the Inference Engine and patented this intuitive technology as the Drafting Assistant. The Drafting Assistant is the cornerstone of Ashlar-Vellum's unique user interface.

In 2008, Ashlar, Incorporated was acquired by Vellum Investment Partners, LLC.

=== Vellum ===
First released in 1988, Ashlar's Vellum software offered precision drafting with ease of use. In 2001 the Vellum product was rebranded as Graphite.

=== Vellum Solids ===
Originating in 1998, Vellum Solids was Ashlar's initial 3D solid and surface modeling, utilizing their unique user interface. In 2001 Vellum Solids was rebranded as Cobalt.
