= UltraVision =

British contact lens manufacturer

UltraVision CLPL
- Formerly: Contact Lens Precision Laboratories
- Type: Private Limited Company
- Industry: Ophthalmology
- Founded: 1967
- Headquarters: Leighton Buzzard, Bedfordshire, England
- Key people: John H Clamp, Co-CEO, CTO; Diane Angell, Co-CEO; J. Keith Lomas, Non-Exec. Dir.; Dick Newell, Non-Exec. Dir.
- Website: www.ultravision.co.uk

UltraVision CLPL is a contact lens manufacturer, with headquarters in Leighton Buzzard, Bedfordshire, England. It ships products across the world.

== History ==
Contact Lens Precision Laboratories (CLPL), was founded in Cambridge in 1967. J. Keith Lomas, who was the company's managing director between 1996 and 2017, oversaw the acquisition of UltraVision in July 2003. Upon that acquisition, the company name was changed to the UltraVision CLPL group.

UltraVision CLPL opened a research-and-development office in 2007. Based in Cambridge, this office has developed various types of contact-lens technologies, including freeform surface modelling, toric lens design, and wavefront technologies, as well as lenses for persons suffering from keratoconus and corneal trauma, KeraSoft.

In April 2018 Contact Lens Precision Laboratories was acquired by SEED Co., Ltd.

== Awards ==
In 2001, UltraVision's Spherical Aberration Management technology received the Award for Innovation in British Optics from the Worshipful Company of Spectacle Makers. In the same year, the company received a Technology Award from EFCLIN (the European Federation of Contact Lens Industry).

UltraVision CLPL has received The Queen's Award for Enterprise: Innovation twice – first in 2006 for its Spherical Aberration Management and Wavefront technologies and again in April 2010 for KeraSoft, UltraVision's patented contact lens for irregular corneas.
