= KeraSoft =

KeraSoft is a patented range of soft and silicone hydrogel contact lenses designed to manage the condition of irregular corneas including keratoconus. They are marketed as an alternative to rigid gas-permeable lenses, offering improved comfort and longer wearing times.

== Overview ==
The KeraSoft range is designed and manufactured in the United Kingdom by UltraVision CLPL. In April 2010, The Queen's Award for Enterprise: Innovation was awarded to UltraVision CLPL specifically for KeraSoft.

KeraSoft lenses are fitted and dispensed by optometrists and opticians in hospital departments, private and high street practices. Ophthalmologists are using the lenses both pre and post-operatively, following cross-linking surgery and as a safer and longer-term solution than corneal transplants.

On 28 January 2011, Bausch & Lomb announced it had completed a global licensing agreement with UltraVision CLPL for KeraSoft.

== See also ==
- Bionic contact lens
