= MEDUSA4 =

CAD program

- Developer: CAD Schroer
- Initial release: 2002; 24 years ago
- Stable release: 7.1 / 2021; 5 years ago
- Operating system: Windows
- Available in: Eng, Ger, It, Fr
- Type: Computer-aided design
- License: Proprietary
- Website: www.cad-schroer.com

M4 DRAFTING (known as MEDUSA and MEDUSA4 in the past) is a CAD program used in the areas of mechanical and plant engineering by manufacturers and engineering, procurement, and construction (EPC) companies. The system's history is closely tied to the beginnings of mainstream CAD and the research culture fostered by Cambridge University and the UK government as well as the resulting transformation of Cambridge into a world-class tech centre in the 1980s.

== Technical summary ==
MEDUSA is based on a platform-independent kernel which, combined with a platform-independent user interface based on the Qt (framework) (with XML for Administration and Web-based client-server communication for data management) allows for a high degree of systems and platform flexibility. The software is available on Windows, Linux and Solaris.

The 4th Generation of the MEDUSA 2D and 3D CAD product family was released by the company CAD Schroer in the summer of 2004. Various software modules and packages have been developed, with MEDUSA4 DRAFTING PLUS, a 2D CAD program with all the standard 2D design functionality and BACIS1 and BACIS2 customisation tools as the base product.

== History ==
=== Background – Cambridge origins: 1967 till 1977 ===
MEDUSA has had a checkered history in the CAD world, which began in Cambridge, UK in the 1970s. MEDUSA’s history is tied in with the Computer-Aided Design Centre (or CADCentre) which was created in Cambridge in 1967 by the UK Government to carry out CAD research.

British computer scientist Dr. Dick Newell worked there on a language-driven 3D plant design system called PDMS (Plant Design Management System).

=== Medusa a product of CIS: 1977 till 1983 ===
In 1977, Dr. Dick Newell together with colleague Tom Sancha, left the CADCentre to form a company called Cambridge Interactive Systems or CIS and primarily concentrated on 2D CAD. CIS had developed an electrical cabling solution initially called CABLOS, which was first purchased by Dowty Engineering in about 1979. Another early adopter was BMW, which used the system for car wiring diagrams. CABLOS soon became known and sold as the MEDUSA drafting system under CIS concentrating initially on schematic drafting. A 2D interaction based 3D modelling system was developed based on a 3rd party 3D engine (Euclid). This used an interaction mechanism embedded in 2D drawings of a form which was meaningful to designers and which could benefit from existing parametric facilities to provide parametric 3D modelling. The proprietary programming language with which MEDUSA version 1 was developed was known as LCIS. Around this time, the company also began developing its own 3D modelling kernel for MEDUSA.

Around 1980, CIS partnered with Prime Computer (also known as PR1ME and PRUNE), a U.S.-based computer hardware provider. Prime had an option on the MEDUSA source code should CIS ever fail.

=== Split – Computervision / Prime Computers product: 1983 till 1987 ===
In 1983 the U.S. CAD company Computervision (CV) purchased CIS. Computervision already had a legacy CAD product called CADDS4, but was interested in obtaining some of the state-of-the-art MEDUSA technology.

At the time, MEDUSA was available on the then newly released 32bit so-called super mini computers, whose most prominent distributors were DEC (VAX) and Prime Computer.

In 1984 there was a fork in MEDUSA: Prime took its option to keep developing MEDUSA. This in effect created two different versions of MEDUSA: CIS MEDUSA (owned by Computervision, which ran on Prime and VAX minicomputers and later on Sun workstations) and Prime MEDUSA (which ran on Prime minicomputers and was later made available on Sun workstations as well). The file format of the two versions drifted apart, as did the command syntax and therefore macro language, as the two versions were developed in slightly different directions.

In Germany in the mid 1980s one MEDUSA workplace with a CV colour graphics terminal and a 19 inch colour screen including the software license cost around 145,000 German Marks (DM). The central computer would cost as much again. Because of the high costs involved, many companies deploying CAD systems reverted to shift work for design staff to make best use of the systems. The first shift might run from six in the morning until two in the afternoon; the second from two until ten o’clock in the evening.

=== Product of Prime Computers: 1987 till 1992 ===
The split in MEDUSA development was merged when Prime Computers bought Computervision, with the promise to CV customers that VAX users would not be forced to switch to Prime workstations. This exercise took significantly longer than suggested by initial marketing statements and the elapsed time consumed represented a period in which the software failed to move forward at all. Furthermore, many users did not trust the siren’s song that all would be well.

The combined effect was that many users changed their CAD system. This was at a time when the PC-based AutoCAD software was becoming successful and offered all the basic 2D design functionality on a PC at a fraction the cost per workstation of the "super mini" or SUN networks. Eventually only those users who used MEDUSA well beyond its 2D capabilities and had it well integrated into their manufacturing processes remained with Prime/CV.

MEDUSA software continued to support the transition from “super minis” to remote workstations, and in the 1990s, the Unix workstations from Sun Microsystems were a popular option for the CAD package.

Prime was divided into the two main divisions: Prime Hardware, which was responsible for the proprietary computer hardware, and Prime Computervision, which was responsible for the CAD/CAM business with MEDUSA and CADDS.

=== Rebranded Computervision product: 1992 till 1998 ===
With falling hardware sales Prime eventually stopped production of PrimOS computers and transferred its maintenance obligations to another company, thus being able to concentrate on the CAD/CAM software business. The company was renamed from Prime Computervision to Computervision (CV). Computervision’s main research and development centre for MEDUSA was at Harston Mill near Cambridge, where many of the development staff had been working on the software since the CIS days. When the company retrenched and moved its operations to Boston, USA in 1994, much of the programming was moved to India, so five former CV staff members with many decades of MEDUSA experience between them formed the software development company Quintic Ltd in Cambridge, which continued to provide MEDUSA development services to CV, and consultancy and customisation services to MEDUSA customers in the UK.

=== PTC: 1998 till 2001 ===
In 1998, CV was taken over by Parametric Technology Corporation (PTC). The development partnership with Quintic also transferred. After years of relative stagnation in the development of MEDUSA NG (Next Generation), there was a new push to launch the new release. MEDUSA NG was the first release to move from tablet-driven design to an icon tray and menu-based graphical user interface; but at that time it was still possible to use the tablet with MEDUSA.

Under PTC's auspices, a new project, code-named "Pegasus" was launched. This was to develop a 2D drafting companion for Pro/ENGINEER based on the MEDUSA technology.

=== CAD Schroer: 2001 till date ===
In 2001, PTC sold all rights to the MEDUSA software to CAD Schroer, MEDUSA's biggest reseller in Germany. CAD Schroer, which started as a drafting bureau in 1986, was an active MEDUSA user and had developed a number of add-ons for the software. Thus MEDUSA was now owned by a company that had grown up with the product. The development partnership with Quintic also transferred to CAD Schroer.

Under CAD Schroer, project Pegasus became the STHENO/PRO software, which was first launched in 2002.

The Fourth generation of MEDUSA, known as MEDUSA4, was launched in 2004. It included a comprehensive revamp of the functionality, the development of a Qt-based GUI, extensive interfaces and integrations with third party systems and data formats, as well as porting to Linux.

In 2005, CAD Schroer acquired its software development partner Quintic and founded CAD Schroer UK in Cambridge, MEDUSA’s home town.

The company continues to develop and support the software.

== MEDUSA4 add-on applications and modules ==
- MPDS4: The MEDUSA4 PLANT DESIGN SYSTEM, a hybrid 2D/3D plant design and factory layout software suite with various modules covering all plant design disciplines and 3D visualisation software
- MEDEA: The MEDUSA Electrical Design Application
- MEDRaster Colour: Module for integrating and editing colour or monochrome raster data, such as scanned legacy drawings or photographs, into CAD designs
- MEDInfo: Web-based engineering information and document management for MEDUSA4
- CADParts: Standard CAD parts library with optional update service
- MEDUSA4 3D PLUS: Sheet-based 3D modelling with optional Digital Terrain Modeller
- MEDUSA4 PARAMETRICS: Extensive parametrics functionality for design process automation
- MEDUSA4 SHEET METAL DESIGN: Powerful and flexible design of sheet metal parts
- MEDUSA4 P&ID: The complete solution for creating intelligent process and instrumentation diagrams
- MEDPro: MEDUSA4 and Pro/ENGINEER integration
- MEDLink: MEDUSA4 and Windchill PDMLink integration
- MED2SAP: MEDUSA4 and mySAP PLM integration
- MED2TC: MEDUSA4 and Teamcenter integration
- CADConvert Pro: Advanced DXF/DWG interface

== MEDUSA4 Personal ==
MEDUSA4 Personal, launched by CAD Schroer in 2006, is a free 2D/3D CAD software for private use, which can be downloaded from the CAD Schroer website. Users have to register to receive a free 12-month license, which can be extended in perpetuity. MEDUSA4 Personal is a fully functional version which includes many features of the MEDUSA4 ADVANCED package (e.g. SMART Edit, basic 3D) as well as some additional add-on modules, such as the MEDRaster Colour image editing module, SMD Sheet Metal Design, and Parametrics. It is a multi-platform system available for Windows and several Linux distributions.

=== Limitations ===
- Print with watermark
- Separate sheet format
- Free node-locked license is limited to 12 months, but renewable

=== Sheet conversion to PDF/DXF/SHE for commercial use ===
In August 2009, CAD Schroer introduced an eSERVICES portal, which allows users of the free version of MEDUSA4 to convert the sheets created with MEDUSA4 Personal into PDFs, DXFs or MEDUSA4 Professional SHE files on a pay-per-conversion basis. The converted drawings appear without a watermark and are fully licensed for commercial use.

== MEDUSER User Group ==
From the 1980s there was an active community of MEDUSA users in Germany. This MEDUSER Association discussed issues of software use, development, CAD/CAM data integration and database connectivity and developed concepts and demands put forward to the various software owners. MEDUSA forums have recently been revived with growing numbers of new users. There also continues to be a core of MEDUSA users who have deployed the system for over two decades.
