= Cambridge Network =

Cambridge Network is a not-for-profit membership organisation that brings people together from business and academia to exchange ideas, foster collaboration and build partnerships for shared success. Through networking, events, training and recruitment services, it connects and supports businesses, sparking collaboration within its vibrant network of members. The organisations that make up its membership base are typical of those found in the 'Cambridge Cluster' or Silicon Fen. The Network fosters an inclusive environment that actively promotes cross-sector and cross-business collaboration, sparking new avenues of innovation.

The network was founded in 1997 by Nigel Brown, David Cleevely, Fred Hallsworth, Hermann Hauser, Anthony Ross and Alec Broers.

Current board members include Nicola Anderson Amadeus Capital Partners, Dr Diarmuid O’Brien of Cambridge University, Lee Welham of Deloitte, Marcus Johnson of Kirly Ltd, Prof Roderick Watkins of Anglia Ruskin University, Peter Taylor of TTP Group, Colin Manktelow of NW Brown Shipley, Dr. Andrew Lynn, Caroline Rowland of Arm Holdings, Vicki Sanderson, Andy Williams Astra Zeneca, Ken Woodberry of Microsoft Research and former Cambridge Network CEO Claire Ruskin. John Gourd is chief executive, appointed in September 2019 and David Mardle of Goodwin Procter is company secretary.

== Activities ==
Cambridge ideas have changed the world and will continue to change the world. The mission at Cambridge Network is simple – to encourage collaboration for shared success. We help raise Cambridge's game, to compete on the world stage, by:

- Fostering closer relationships and sharing ideas between businesses, academia and individuals through a calendar of Member events
- Sharing high-quality training and facilitating peer learning groups through our learning and development services
- Connecting people and companies for research and partnering through our knowledge of local expertise and our comprehensive Member directory
- Enabling members to find and attract quality candidates to work in Cambridge, through networking and our high-profile jobs board Recruitment Gateway
- Facilitating co-operation, action and resource sharing by being a focal point for organisations in the Cambridge region

A number of special interest groups have arisen from Cambridge Network activities.
