= David Cleevely =

British telecoms expert (born 1953)

David Cleevely CBE FREng FIET
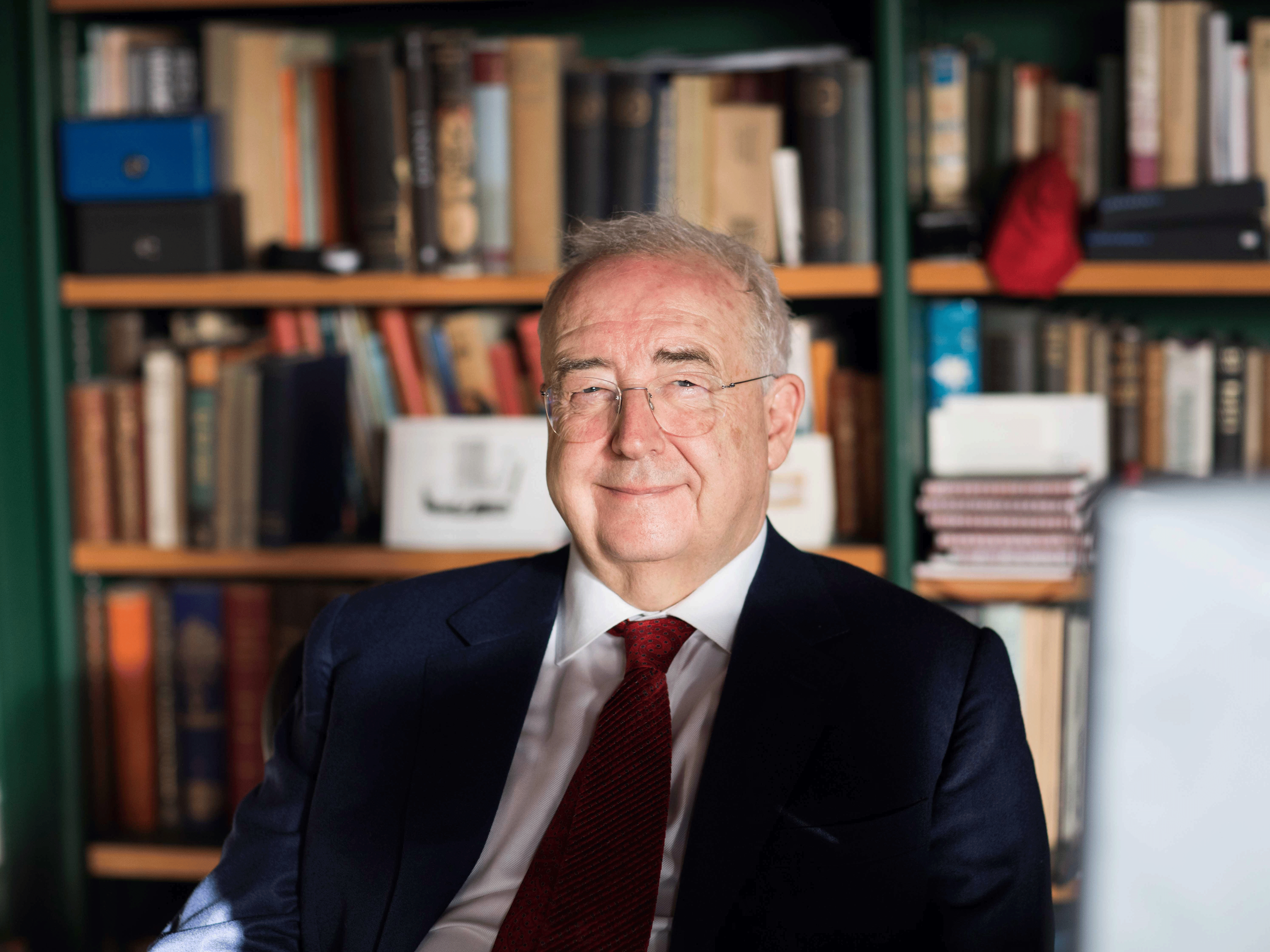
- Born: September 1953 (age 72)
- Occupations: Telecoms expert, entrepreneur

David Douglas Cleevely CBE FREng FIET (born September 1953) is a British entrepreneur and international telecoms expert who has built and advised many companies, principally in Cambridge, England.

== Telecommunications ==
In 1985 Cleevely founded the telecommunications consultancy Analysys which became Analysys Mason, when it was acquired by Datatec in 2004. Whilst at Analysys he made a significant contribution to the theory and practice of calculating Universal Service Obligation costs and was involved with a report to the European Commission on VoIP creating the framework for VoIP within the EU and the identification of The Broadband Gap – where the cost of supply would exceed the price consumers were willing to pay which prompted UK Government policy intervention in 2001–2005 to force increased broadband infrastructure in the UK.

== Entrepreneurship ==
Cleevely's entrepreneurial activities have been focused on the Cambridge area, with Business Weekly describing him as, "Intellectual heavyweight and passionate evangelist for the cluster" and was reported in the Financial Times which noted his role in founding Cambridge Network, Cambridge Angels and other contributions. He has worked tirelessly to get government to understand what makes Cambridge academia and business tick.

In 1997 Cleevely co-founded Cambridge Network with Hermann Hauser, Alec Broers, Nigel Brown, Fred Hallsworth and Anthony Ross.

In 1998 he co-founded biotech company Abcam plc and was chairman until November 2009. Abcam exited to Danaher Corp for $5.7bn in 2023.

In 2001 he co-founded and became chairman of Cambridge Wireless (originally Cambridge 3G) with Edward Astle. He later said of the mobile industry, "This is an industry undergoing a revolution. The competitive edge is moving from handsets to platforms, from voice to data, from services to apps. The move of the big internet players into mobile is just the beginning. The future of the industry hinges on how this will play out."

In the same year Cleevely co-founded Cambridge Angels, a group of angel investors who have now invested over £20m into 40 companies in the Cambridge area.

In late 2004 he co-founded the 3g pico base station company, 3WayNetworks, which was sold to Airvana in April 2007. Between 2005 and 2008 he was Chairman of the Communications Research Network at University of Cambridge, part of the Cambridge–MIT Institute.

In 2007 he co-founded and became the Chairman of the spectrum monitoring company CRFS, which has subsequently carried out the first ever UK-wide spectrum monitoring. In 2008 he also became the Chairman of the scanning ion-conductance microscopy company Ionscope.

He funded and became chairman of the Bocca di Lupo restaurant in Soho, London in 2008, and of its subsidiary, Gelupo, in 2011. Bocca di Lupo came top in Time Out London's 50 best restaurants for 2009, was a runner-up in the Observer Food Monthly Awards 2010 and was named by Restaurant Magazine as the 23rd best restaurant in the UK at the National Restaurant Awards 2010. In 2013 he also invested in Cambridge restaurant The Pint Shop.

Cleevely was Chairman of LabTech company OpenIOLabs, and became Non-Executive Director when they were acquired by DeepMatter (formerly Cronin Group) in 2017 and stepped down in May 2019.

In 2019 he joined the board of Focal Point Positioning as Chair and has taken it through two successive funding rounds. In 2020 Focal Point Positioning was awarded both The Duke of Edinburgh's Navigation Award for Outstanding Technical Achievement from the Royal Institute of Navigation, and the Hottest SpaceTech Startup in Europe accolade from the Europas.

In April 2023 Privitar a privacy safeguarding company based on a patent by David Cleevely and John Taysom was one of the winners of the Challenge to Drive Innovation in Privacy-Enhancing Technologies that Reinforce Democratic Values, awarded by the United States and the United Kingdom governments.

Cleevely helped Professor Lee Cronin spin Chemify out from the University of Glasgow in 2021 and became Chairman. In 2023 Chemify announced the completion of £36m ($43m) funding. Nobel Prize winner Sir Fraser Stoddart said “I see Chemify as a major development for the field of chemistry.”

== Public policy and government ==
Cleevely is an authority on telecommunication policy and has advised numerous governments on policy and innovation frameworks. He advised the Prime Minister and UK Government on the ecommerce@its.best.uk report, and was one of the 8 industry experts that compiled the Communications White Paper which became the Communications Act 2003.

In 2001 he was appointed by the UK government to the Spectrum Management Advisory Group, which became the Ofcom Spectrum Advisory Board, and the IET Communications Policy Panel and was also appointed Advisor to Main Board of DCSA (later the DES ISS) until 2009. He has also appeared before Select committees in both Parliament and in the House of Lords.

In 2009 David Cleevely became the Founding Director for the new Centre for Science and Policy and subsequently Chair of the Advisory Council, stepping down from the role in 2018.

January 2015 saw him also join the Digital Economy Council (where he was a member until 2017) and was also on the advisory board for the Oxford Internet Institute from 2012 to 2018.

In 2015, his contribution to the UK Government-backed report Visions of Cambridge 2065 saw him predict dramatic changes in the city over the coming 50 years, such as having more than 1 million residents, two $100 billion companies and a regional underground system.

In 2017 he wrote the initial terms of reference for the Cambridge and Peterborough Independent Economic Review funded by Cambridge Ahead and the Combined Authority and agreed at the meeting of the Council Authority 28 June 2017. He was Vice Chair and Commissioner for the Cambridge and Peterborough Independent Economic Review until September 2018.

In 2018 he gave the Founding Director's lecture at the University of Cambridge on getting academics and policy makers to work together.

In 2018 he became an advisor to the National Engineering Policy Centre at the Royal Academy of Engineering and subsequently became chair of the Policy Fellowship Working Group.

He was Chair of the Digital Sector Strategy Commission for the Greater Cambridgeshire Greater Peterborough Combined Authority which reported in March 2019.

In September 2019 he became Chair of the Cambridge Autonomous Metro Technical Advisory Committee (CAM TAC) Sep 2019 and in June 2020 co-authored a report for the CAM TAC with Professor John Miles setting out the technical and costing options for the CAM which James Palmer, the Mayor of the Combined Authority, described as "a game changer .... an exceptional piece of work which gives a clear way forward".

In November 2019 he took over from Ian Shott as Chair of the Royal Academy of Engineering Enterprise Committee, and was succeeded by John Lazar in October 2022.

During 2018 he proposed setting up a Policy Fellowship Scheme at the Royal Academy of Engineering and became Chair of the Policy Fellows Working Group in September 2019. The programme has grown rapidly to over 60 policy fellows from Whitehall and the devolved administrations.

In March 2020 he was appointed Chair of the Royal Academy of Engineering COVID-19 Triage Group and which issued a report in August 2020 setting out how the RAE made a major contribution to addressing the crisis.

He was Chair of the New Era for the Cambridge Economy which reported on 31 March 2022 on the changes that the Covid pandemic has brought about and the 6 challenges facing Cambridge and other city regions to recognise and take advantage of the changes that are taking place.

Cleevely is a member of the Advisory Council for Creative Destruction Labs (Oxford), a non-profit organisation helping science and technology-based startups from across the globe.

In 2025, Cleevely gave oral and written evidence to the House of Lords Science and Technology Committee’s inquiry on financing and scaling UK science and technology. He argued for a cross-government “Scaling Authority” and a decentralised “concierge” network to help high-potential firms navigate regulation and government. The Committee discussed these proposals and recommended establishing an authoritative concierge service to fast-track scaling companies.

== Charitable work ==
In 2012 Cleevely joined forces with Hermann Hauser and Jonathan Milner — described as the "three musketeers of the Cambridge technology cluster" — to provide funding to create a Science Centre in Cambridge. He has been Chairman and substantial donor since 2013 and the Cambridge Science Centre reported over 300,000 cumulative visitors in 2019.

In 2013 he joined the board of Raspberry Pi (Trading) Ltd. and in 2014 he became Chairman (unremunerated) of the Raspberry Pi Foundation and of Raspberry Pi Trading. He stepped down as Chair of Raspberry Pi Trading in February 2019 and was succeeded by John Lazar.

== Education ==
After gaining a BSc in Cybernetics and Instrument Physics with Mathematics from the University of Reading, Cleevely gained a PhD in Telecommunications and Economic Development from Cambridge University.

== Awards and honours ==
David Cleevely was appointed Commander of the Order of the British Empire (CBE) in the 2013 New Year Honours for services to technology and innovation.

He is a Fellow of the Royal Academy of Engineering (FREng), and has held an Industrial Fellowship at the University of Cambridge Computer Laboratory. He is also a Fellow of the Institute of Engineering and Technology (FIET), where he gave the IEE Pinkerton Lecture, "Seizing the Moment: The Far Reaching Effects of Broadband on Economy and Society" in November 2002, and the 41st IEE Appleton Lecture 'Is there a future for research in telecommunications?' in January 2006 and the 46th IET Appleton Lecture 'What is the future for communications? What does it mean for the UK?' in January 2011.

In June 2013, Cleevely became a Fellow Commoner of Queens' College, Cambridge. and in October 2015 became an Honorary Fellow of Trinity Hall, Cambridge

In November 2018 Cleevely won Barclays "Entrepreneurs' Icon of the Year"

In December 2022 Cleevely was awarded the honorary degree of Doctor of Education by the University of Bath "in recognition of his impact on the technological aspects of our industries, his ongoing role in the mentoring and support of the entrepreneurs and engineers who have followed him into starting their own companies, for his development of our national policy and contributions to our national life."

In July 2023 Cleevely was awarded the honorary degree of Doctor of Technology by Anglia Ruskin University for "significant contributions to the success of Cambridge, having been a co-founder and Chair of Cambridge Network, Cambridge Wireless, Cambridge Angels, and co-founder of Cambridge Ahead and Founding Director of the Centre for Science and Policy at the University of Cambridge."

== Publications ==
Title	Year	Authors	Publisher	Pages
Rural Telecoms Handbook: Equipment and Manufacturers	1992	Tim Hills, David Cleevely	Analysys Publications	–
Regional Structure and Telecommunications Demand: A Case Study of Kenya (PhD thesis)	1982	D. D. Cleevely	University of Cambridge	–
The Route to Advanced Communications	1991	David Cleevely, Stefan Stanislawski, Ade Ajibulu	Analysys Publications	178
Global Turf Wars: Re-Inventing the Telecoms Operator for the Age of Global Competition	1999	Tim Hills, David Cleevely, Andrea Smith	Analysis Publications	218
ATM Vendor & Operator Strategies	1993	David Cleevely, Peter Aknai, Ian Leslie	Analysis Publications	180
The Far Reaching Effects of Broadband	2002	David Cleevely	Institution of Engineering & Technology	415
Regulating the Telecoms Market: Competition and Innovation in the Broadband Economy	2003	Tim Hills, David Cleevely, Ross Pow	Analysis Publications	35
Owning the Future: How Britain can Make it in a Fast-Changing World (contributor)	2014	Chuka Umunna, David Cleevely et al.	Rowman and Littlefield International	137
Connect people, build infrastructure, grow clusters: How to make the most of UK innovation	2014	David Cleevely, Sherry Coutu, Hermann Hauser, Andy Richards	Entrepreneurship and Innovation Policy	18
Visions of Cambridge in 2065 (contributor)	2015	Dr Konstantina Stamati, Dr Rosamunde Almond, Dr Moira V. Faul	Centre for Science and Policy, Cambridge Forum for Sustainability and the Environment	25
Successful Career Beyond the Lab: Skills, Networks and Luck.	2017	D. Bennett & R. Jennings	Cambridge University Press	370
Cambridgeshire and Peterborough Independent Economic Review	2018	Cambridge and Peterborough Combined Authority	Cambridge and Peterborough Combined Authority	136
A lecture by Dr David Cleevely, CSaP Founding Director (2008-2015)	2018	Cambridge University Centre for Science and Policy	Cambridge University Centre for Science and Policy	8
