= Martin Newell (computer scientist) =

American computer scientist

Martin Edward Newell
- Education: University of Utah
- Known for: Utah Teapot; Newell's algorithm
- Awards: Elected member of the National Academy of Engineering
- Scientific career
- Workplaces: CADCentre; University of Utah; Xerox PARC; CADLINC; Ashlar; Adobe
- Thesis: The Utilization of Procedure Models in Digital Image Synthesis (1975)
- Website: academic.research.microsoft.com/Author/478161

Martin Edward Newell is a British-born computer scientist specializing in computer graphics. He is the creator of the Utah teapot, one of the benchmark models in 3D rendering.

== Career ==
Before immigrating to the US, he worked at what was then the Computer-Aided Design Centre (CADCentre) in Cambridge, UK, along with his brother Dick Newell (who went on to co-found two of the most important UK graphics software companies – Cambridge Interactive Systems (CIS) in 1977 and Smallworld in 1987). At CADCentre, the two Newells and Tom Sancha developed Newell's algorithm, a technique for eliminating cyclic dependencies when ordering polygons to be drawn by a computer graphics system.

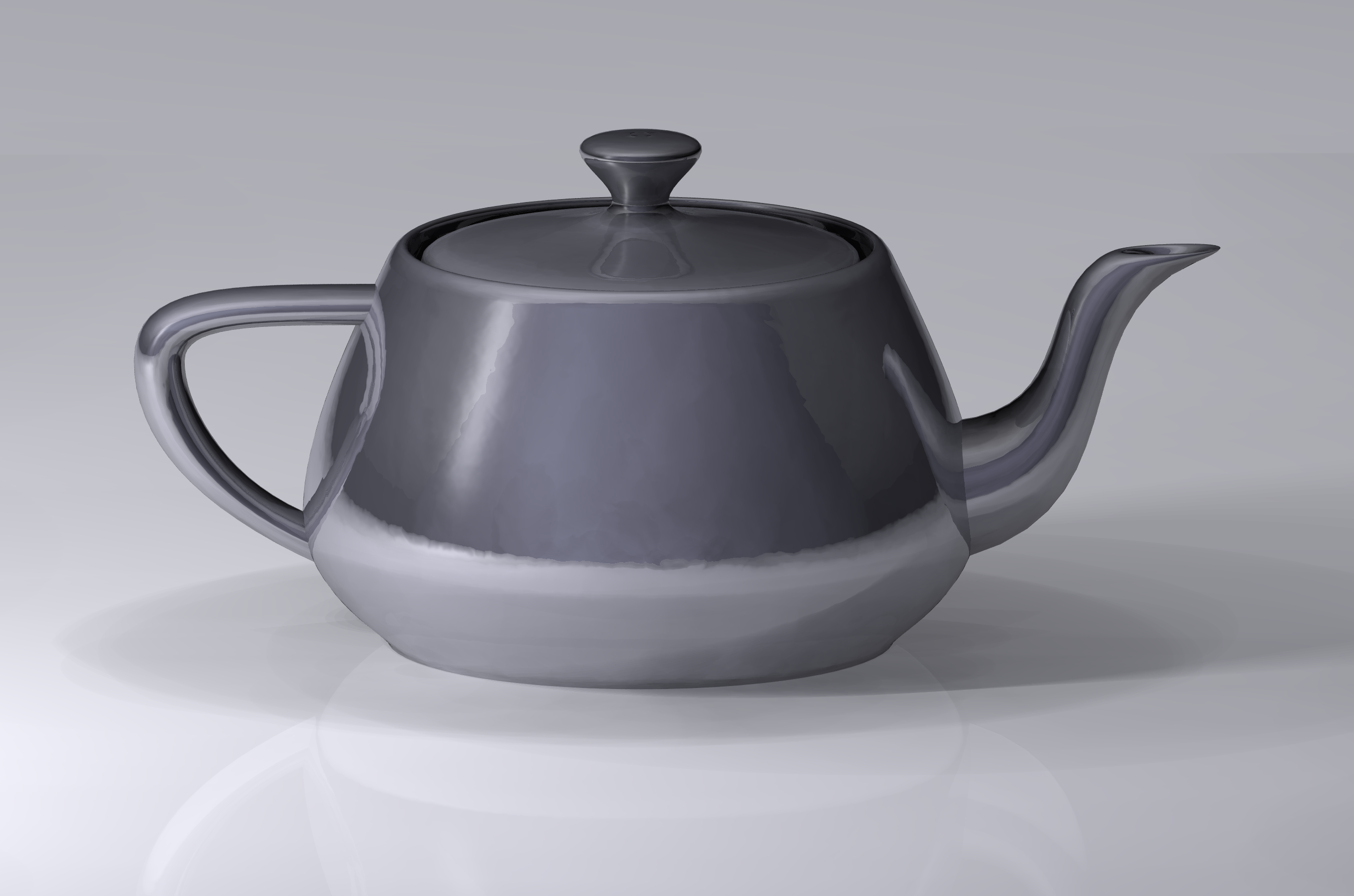
The Utah teapot, a model by Martin Newell (1975).

Newell developed the Utah teapot while working on a Ph.D. at the University of Utah, where he also helped develop a version of the painter's algorithm for rendering. He graduated in 1975, and was on the Utah faculty from 1977 to 1979. Later he worked at Xerox PARC, where he worked on JaM, a predecessor of PostScript. JaM stood for "John and Martin" – the John was John Warnock, co-founder of Adobe Systems.

Newell departed Xerox PARC to join CADLINC Inc., a factory automation startup, as VP of Advanced Development. There he led the development of a variety of CAD/CAM software applications, such as CimCAD (a 3-D drafting program) and Intelligent Documentation (an early electronic document editor integrating text, graphics, and information from relational databases).

He departed CADLINC to found the computer-aided design software company Ashlar in 1988. In 2007, Newell was elected a member of the National Academy of Engineering for contributions to computer-graphics modeling, rendering, and printing. He recently retired as an Adobe Fellow at Adobe Systems.
