= Z+F UK =

Z+F
- Type: Private company
- Founded: Wangen, Germany (1963)
- Founder: Hans Zoller and Hans Fröhlich
- Headquarters: Wangen, Germany
- Products: Laser scanners, LFM software
- Owner: Dr. Christoph Fröhlich
- Number of employees: More than 300
- Subsidiaries: Z+F GmbH in Wangen, Germany Z+F UK in Manchester, UK Z+F USA in Pittsburgh, US
- Website: http://www.zf-uk.com

Z+F (Zoller & Fröhlich) are suppliers of high-speed phase-based laser measurement and scanning systems. The company supplies laser scanning hardware, software and scanning services capturing high resolution data. They develop hardware and software, and offer sales and product training.

== Historical background ==
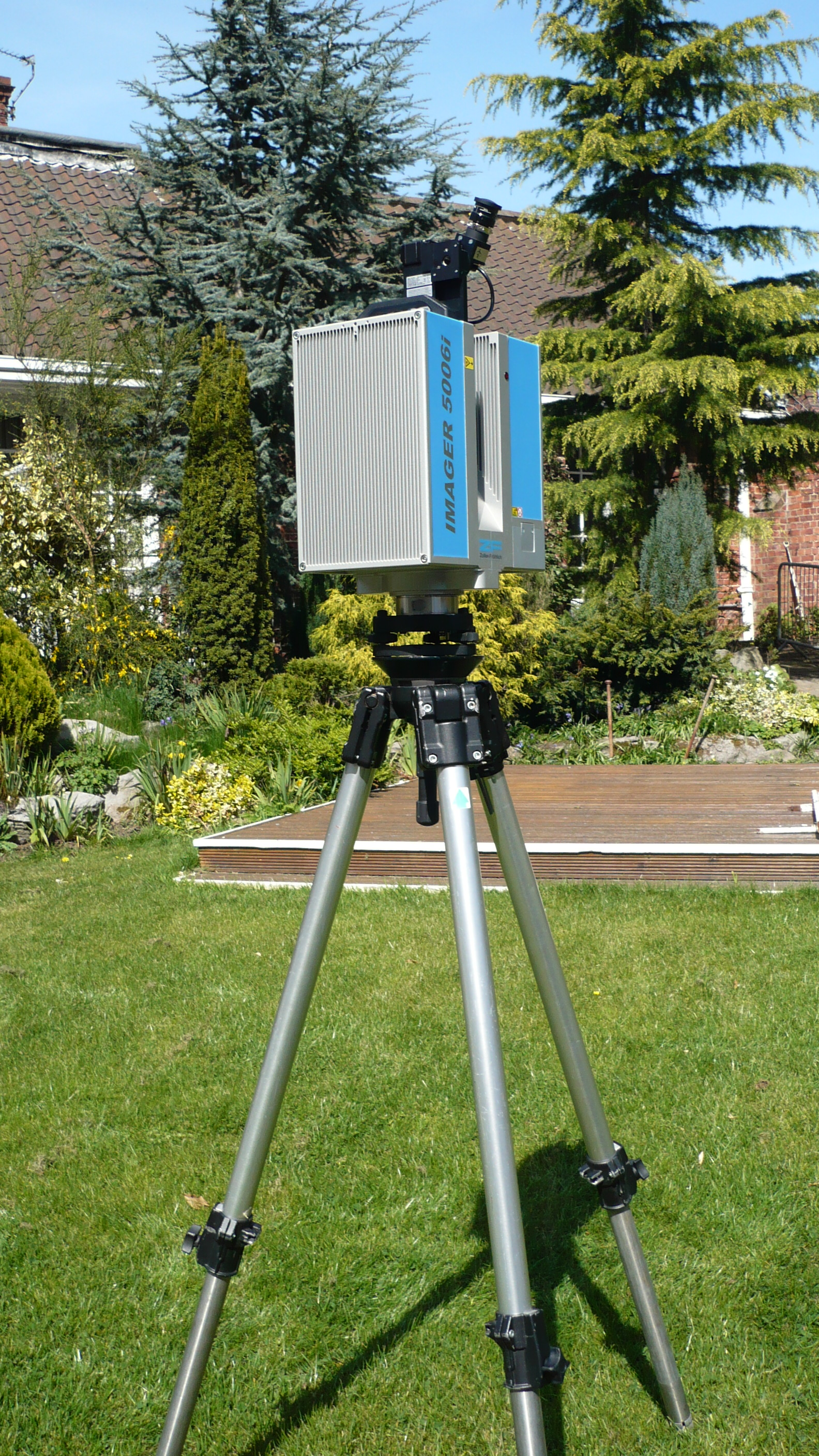
Imager 5006i

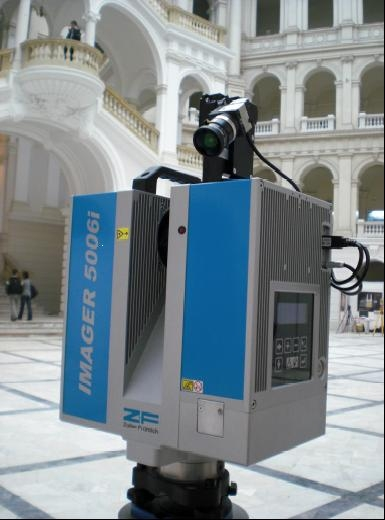
M-CAM CAMERA

Z+F is a privately owned company, founded in 1963 by Hans Zoller and Hans Fröhlich. Since the death of Hans Zoller in 1975, the company has remained under the ownership of the Fröhlich family. The current managing director is Dr. Christoph Fröhlich, who is the son of Hans Fröhlich.

Z+F have several businesses existing within the Group umbrella. These include ferrules and ferrule machines, wiring systems and laser scanning. The company has specialised in supplying high speed laser scanning systems to customers since the early 1990s following the completion of a doctorate in this subject by Christoph Fröhlich.

== 3D Laser scanning Products ==
The IMAGER 5006 was the first true "stand alone" laser scanner, worldwide. The integrated hard disk and power supply and operating methods enable a completely wireless operation.

== Software ==
LFM (Light Form Modeller) software has been designed to work with the high resolution data captured by the IMAGER 5006i 3D laser scanner. LFM is used to take the data from the field, through registration and viewing, to delivery to the designers or operators desktop.

On 3 October 2011, AVEVA announced the acquisition of LFM (Light Form Modeller) software division of Z+F UK Limited.
