= Abcam =

British biotechnology company

Abcam Limited
- Formerly: Abcam Limited (1998–2005); Abcam plc (2005–2023)
- Type: Subsidiary
- Traded as: AIM: ABC; Nasdaq: ABCM
- Industry: Biotechnology; Life sciences
- Founded: 1998; 28 years ago
- Founders: Jonathan Milner; Tony Kouzarides; David Cleevely
- Headquarters: Cambridge Biomedical Campus, Cambridge, UK
- Key people: Kaveh Kahen (president)
- Products: Research antibodies; Kits and assays for biological research
- Revenue: ▲£361.7 million (2022)
- Operating income: ▼£(10.1) million (2022)
- Net income: ▼£(8.5) million (2022)
- Total assets: ▲£1,057 million (2022)
- Total equity: ▲£726.9 million (2022)
- Number of employees: 1,760 (2022)
- Parent: Danaher Corporation (2023–present)
- Website: www.abcam.com/en-us

Abcam Limited is a producer, distributor and seller of protein research tools operating worldwide from 13 locations with 1,800 employees of which 400 work in Research and Development (R&D). Abcam was listed on the Nasdaq and the London Stock Exchange until it was acquired by Danaher Corporation in 2023.

== History ==
The company was founded in 1998 by Jonathan Milner with co-founders professor Tony Kouzarides and David Cleevely, with the idea of making it easier for research scientists to buy antibodies across the web. Milner was a postdoctoral researcher studying the newly discovered breast cancer protein BRCA2 in Kouzarides' Cambridge University laboratory. The project had slowed because of problems finding quality antibody reagents that had honest and up-to-date information about their uses and limitations. This scenario provided the motivation to form an on-line service that would help themselves and researchers across the globe.

Since its inception in 1998, the company has diversified from carrying only antibodies. It supplies antibody related products such as immunoassays (e.g. SimpleStep ELISA Kits), peptides, proteins and protein detection products (e.g. immunohistochemistry (IHC) staining kits). Abcam also has a portfolio of non-antibody related products such as biochemicals, cellular assays, and epigenetics kits (e.g. FirePlex Multiplex miRNA Kits).

In 2019 Abcam moved its global headquarters to the Cambridge Biomedical Campus, a leading hub for healthcare, science, and medical research.

On 28 August 2023, Danaher Corporation announced that it had entered into a definitive agreement to acquire Abcam for approximately $5.7 billion at $24 per share in cash. The acquisition process included shareholder approval in November 2023 and the completion of regulatory clearances later that month. The acquisition was completed on 6 December, following approval by the High Court of Justice of England and Wales. As a result, Abcam became an indirect wholly owned subsidiary of Danaher, and its shares ceased trading on Nasdaq after the completion of the deal.

== Acquisitions ==
In May 2011, Abcam announced the acquisition of MitoSciences, a privately held biotech company based in Eugene, Oregon (US). The company produced and distributed immunoassay platforms and high performance monoclonal antibodies. It was founded in 2004 with the mission of advancing mitochondrial research and developing products that support critical research in cancer, neurodegeneration, and metabolic disorders.

On 12 September 2011, Abcam completed the purchase of Ascent Scientific, a company based in Bristol, United Kingdom which provided biochemical products that modulate the function of proteins for use in life science research. After outsourcing biochemical production, the Bristol site and manufacturing facilities were closed in 2017.

On 19 April 2012, Abcam completed the purchase of Epitomics, a privately held biotech company in Burlingame, California (US) and Hangzhou (China) which focused on the development, production, and distribution of rabbit monoclonal antibodies for biomedical research and diagnostic applications.

On 20 January 2015, Abcam announced the acquisition of Firefly BioWorks, a privately held company based in Cambridge, Massachusetts (US), for £18,500,000. Firefly developed a novel multiplex assay platform for the detection of biomarkers, based on a microfabrication technology developed by Daniel Pregibon and Patrick Doyle at Massachusetts Institute of Technology, and launched its first products for the multiplex detection of microRNA from RNA and crude biofluid. Firefly was rebranded to FirePlex in 2016.

On 11 November 2015, Abcam announced the acquisition of AxioMx. AxioMx, based in Branford, Connecticut (US), "provides a comprehensive custom recombinant antibody discovery and development services platform".

Abcam acquired Calico Biolabs in January 2019. A year later, on 6 January 2020, Abcam announces the successful acquisition of Expedeon's Proteomics and Immunology business, which includes Innova and TGR Biosciences. On 4 March 2020, Abcam extend their assay and labelling capabilities by acquiring Marker Gene Technologies for an undisclosed amount. The acquisition of Marker Gene Technologies bring expertise in the areas of biology, organic synthesis and fluorescence chemistry. The team from MGT are experienced in the creation of detection tools that enable enhanced understanding of biological processes.
