= Cambridge–MIT Institute =

Former university partnership

Coordinates: 52.205°N 0.117°E

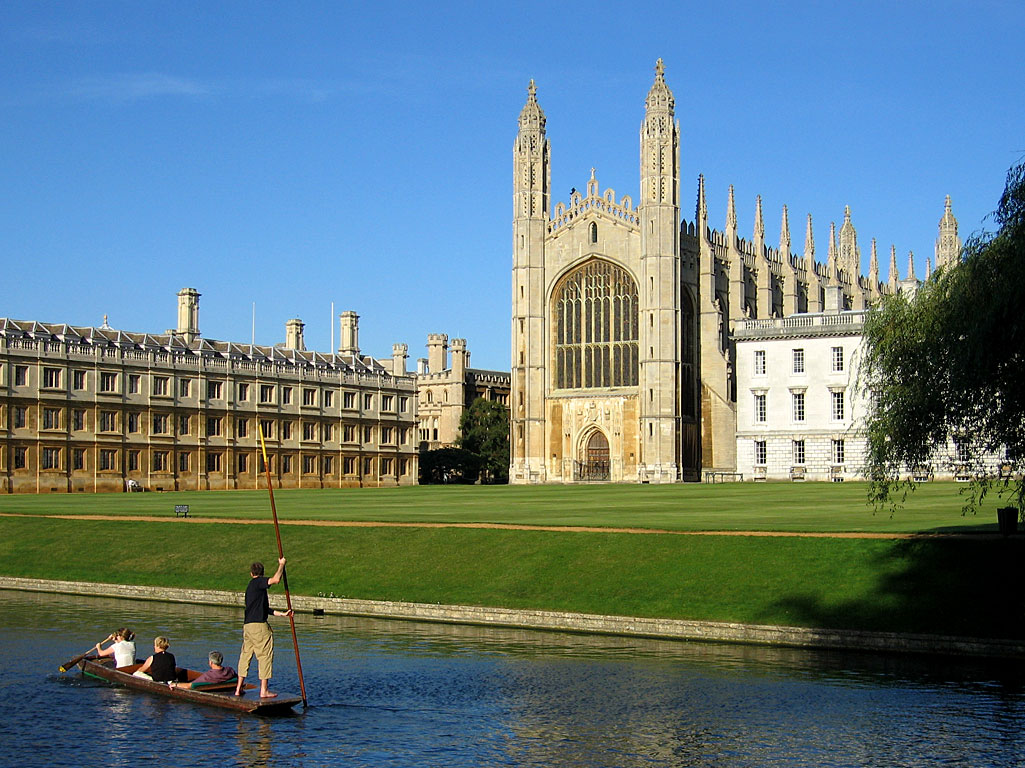
King's College at the University of Cambridge

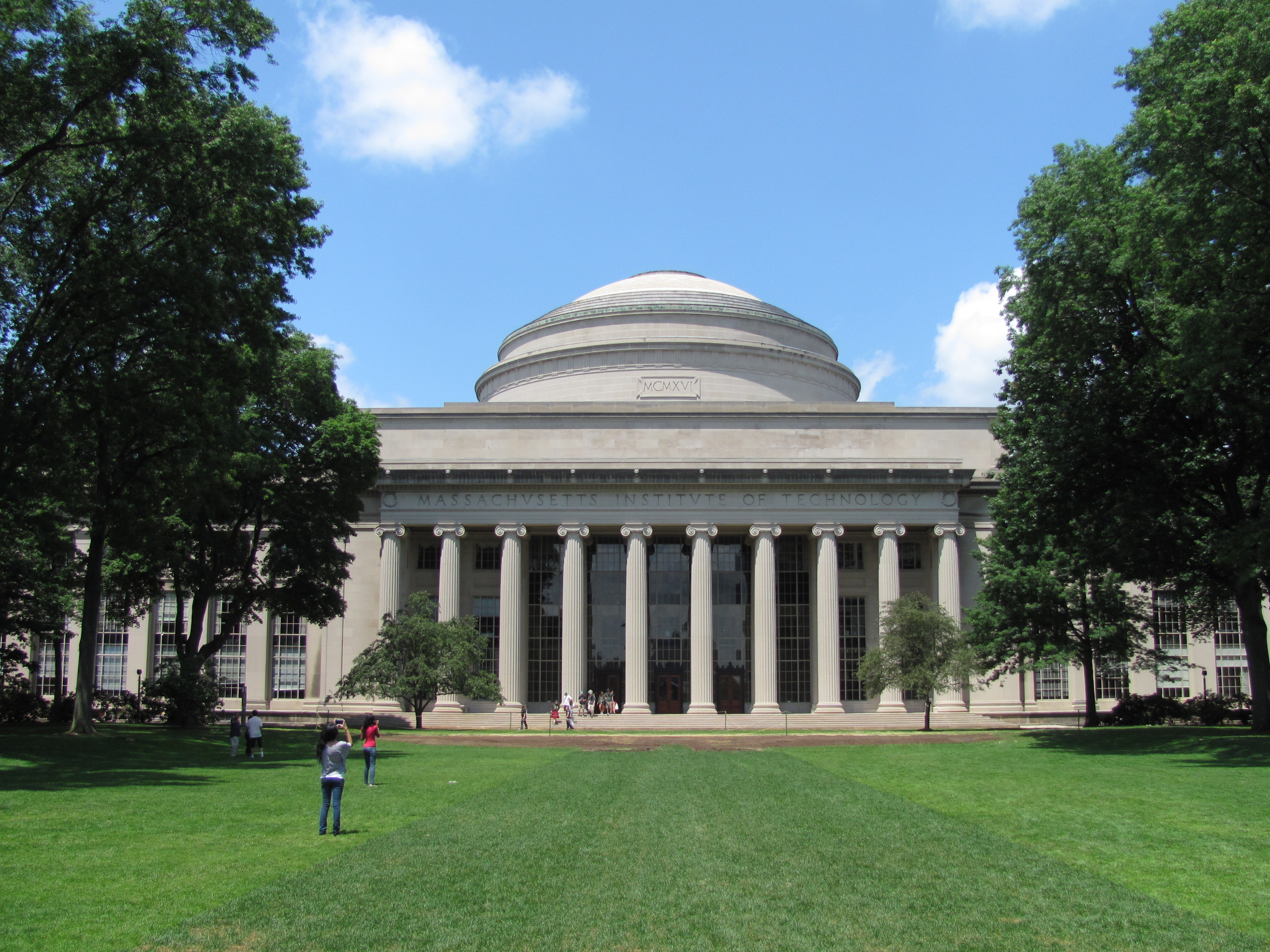
MIT's Great Dome

The Cambridge–MIT Institute, or CMI, was a partnership between the University of Cambridge in Cambridge, England, and the Massachusetts Institute of Technology in Cambridge, Massachusetts. In 2008, CMI issued a final report describing its activities from late 2000 to 2006, stating that it had "evolved into the CMI Partnership Programme." The CMI website hosted by the University of Cambridge later noted that, "CMI activities are now fully embedded within the two institutions."

It was proposed by former British Chancellor of the Exchequer Gordon Brown in the summer of 1998, who wanted to bring the entrepreneurial spirit of MIT to British universities. Cambridge University was chosen as MIT's partner because of its strong record in science/engineering and the abundance of high-technology firms located in the Cambridge area known as Silicon Fen.

Funded both by government and industry partners, including BP and British Telecom, CMI experimented with new ways of bringing universities, industries, and government together to ensure that research findings are quickly exploited for the benefit of society and the economy of the United Kingdom. This included funding new ideas in research and education, and the study and assessment of knowledge exchange experiments.

Aiming ultimately to enhance competitiveness, productivity and entrepreneurship in the UK, CMI also worked with a network of partners across the UK, holding a range of events to share lessons learnt, to develop effective models for national uptake, and to facilitate the debate on issues ranging from the role of universities in stimulating innovation, to ways of teaching the new skills required by emerging technologies.

One of the major initiatives arising from the collaboration of MIT and Cambridge was the development of silent aircraft technologies.
