= Ewan Kirk =

British technology entrepreneur (born 1961)

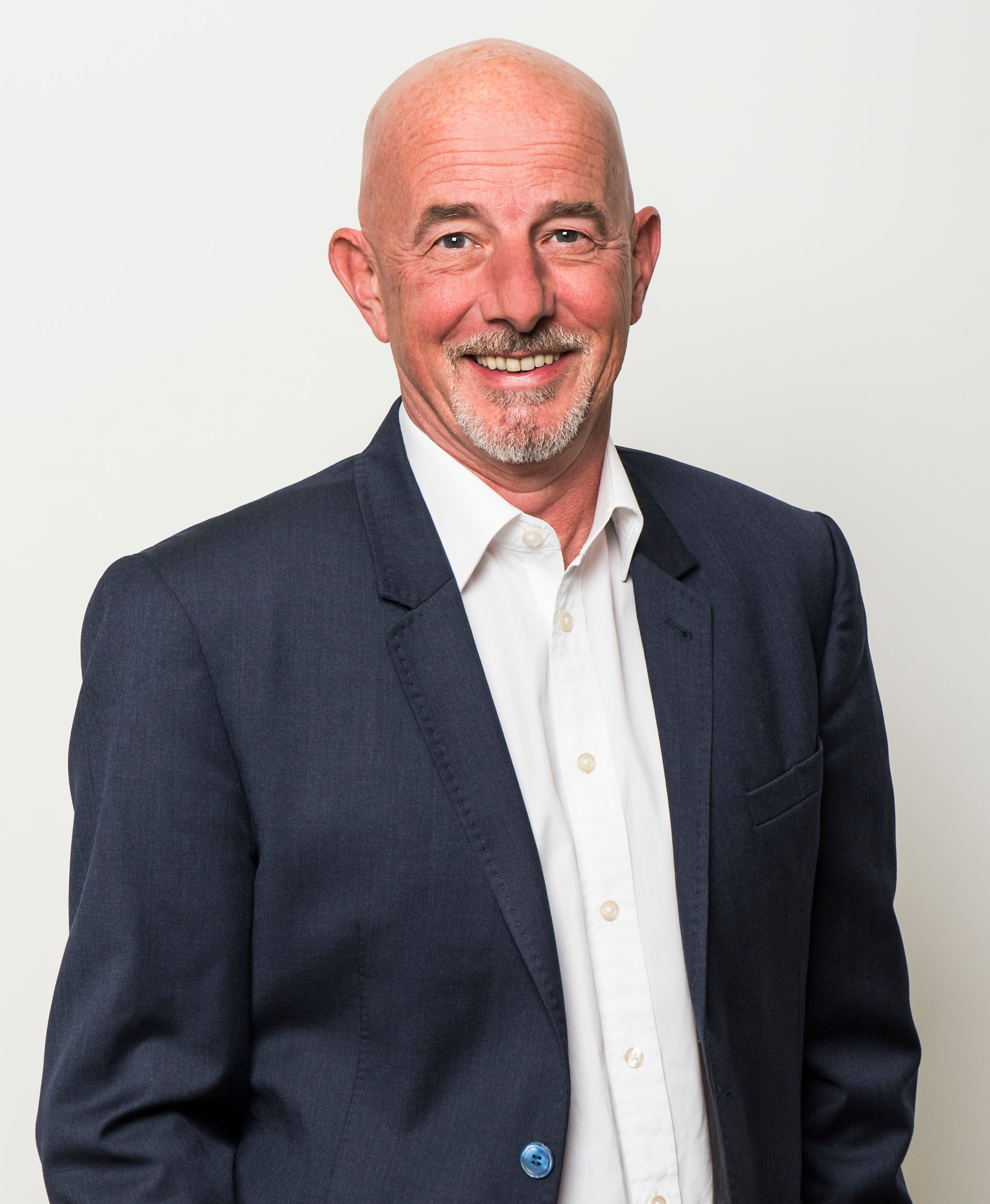
- Kirk in 2015
- Born: Ewan Mckinnon Kirk; February 1961 (age 65); Swindon, Wiltshire, England
- Education: University of Glasgow; University of Cambridge; University of Southampton
- Occupations: Investor and businessman
- Organization(s): Chair of the Isaac Newton Institute; Founder of the Turner-Kirk Charitable Trust
- Known for: Founder of Cantab Capital Partners
- Website: www.cantabcapital.com

Ewan Mckinnon Kirk (born February 1961) is a British technology entrepreneur, founder of Cantab Capital Partners, chair of the Isaac Newton Institute for Mathematical Sciences and Non-Executive Director of BAE Systems. He is also Co-Chair of the Turner Kirk Trust which supports STEM, education and conservation causes in the UK and the developing world.

== Early life and education ==
Kirk was born in February 1961 in Swindon, Wiltshire. He was raised in Scotland where he was brought up in Glasgow and attended Greenfaulds High School in Cumbernauld, North Lanarkshire. He studied for a BSc in Natural philosophy and Astronomy at the University of Glasgow before studying Part III of the Mathematical Tripos at the University of Cambridge. He was awarded a PhD in General relativity at the University of Southampton.

== Career ==
Whilst at university, Kirk founded DaLEK Software, which developed the Computer-aided design (CAD) package MicroDraft for Amstrad CPC and PCW computers. After graduation from Southampton, he returned to Cambridge, as Director at Innovation for the science and technology consultancy Scientific Generics.

=== Goldman Sachs ===
In 1992, Kirk joined Goldman Sachs, initially working in commodities before moving to currencies. He was appointed a managing director in 1998, and became a Partner in 2000. As a partner, Kirk was responsible for heading up the bank's European quantitative technologies group, which tested systematic investment strategies. He oversaw a team of 120 mathematicians, scientists and statisticians.

=== Cantab Capital Partners ===
In 2006, he founded Cantab Capital Partners, a science-driven quantitative investment management firm in Cambridge. The firm says its work resembles a "scientific research organisation" more than a financial firm. Most of the members of the team hold advanced degrees in mathematics, physics, statistics or computer science. The company has links with the University of Cambridge.

In 2016, Cantab Capital Partners was acquired by GAM Investments, becoming part of GAM Systematic. At the time of acquisition, Cantab Capital Partners had 56 employees and £4.5bn under management. In February 2020, GAM Systematic won Eurohedge's 'Managed Futures – Under $500m' award for 2019.

In 2020, Kirk was awarded HFM's Lifetime Achievement Award for his founding role in Cantab, contributions to quantitative investment and developing science-led approaches to finance.

He exited as President of GAM Systematic Cantab in March 2021.

=== Other activity ===
Kirk is chair of the Isaac Newton Institute for Mathematical Sciences.

In June 2021, Kirk joined the Board of BAE Systems.

Kirk is the Chair of and Founding Investor in Deeptech Labs, a start-up accelerator and Venture Capital fund based in Cambridge focused on building deep tech companies.

In 2023, Kirk was made an honorary Doctor of Science by the University of Southampton.

In 2023, he was appointed the Royal Society Entrepreneur in Residence at the University of Cambridge's mathematics department.

== Philanthropy ==
In 2007, Ewan Kirk and his wife Dr Patricia Turner founded the Turner Kirk Trust, which provides funds to STEM, education and conservation causes in the UK and developing world. It funds "very high risk" projects.

Since founding, Kirk's charitable trust has disbursed more than £7 million in funding. It is one of the largest private funders of fundamental mathematics research in the UK. In 2015, through Cantab Capital Partners, he donated £5 million to the University of Cambridge to establish the Cantab Capital Institute for the Mathematics of Information.

== Political activity ==
In 2016, Kirk was part of the official campaign making the pro-science case for remaining in the European Union during the UK’s referendum on EU membership and donated £10,000 to Scientists for EU.

Kirk is a member of the Liberal Democrats Business and Entrepreneurs Network, which is ‘a network of senior business people’ that ‘provides the party with expert advice on business and economic policy’. During the 2019 general election, Kirk was one of 60 business leaders to sign an open letter endorsing the Liberal Democrats and donated £300,000 to the party.

== Personal life ==
Kirk is married and lives in Cambridge.
