= Cantab Capital Partners =

Hedge fund based in Cambridge, England

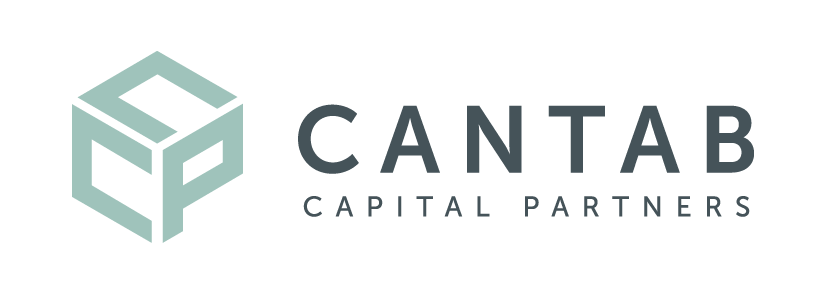
- Industry: Hedge fund
- Founded: 2006
- Headquarters: City House; 126-130 Hills Road; Cambridge CB2 1RE; United Kingdom
- Area served: Worldwide
- Key people: Dr. Ewan Kirk (Chief Investment, Executive Officer and Partner); Erich Schlaikjer (Chief Technology Officer and Partner)
- Products: Systematic macro investment
- AUM: ▲US$ 4,500 million (2015)
- Website: www.cantabcapitalpartners.com

Cantab Capital Partners is a hedge fund based in Cambridge, England, co-founded by Dr. Ewan Kirk and Erich Schlaikjer. Cantab operates quantitative funds using computer models to drive investment decisions. As of Feb 2015 Cantab had $4.5 billion in assets under management, after launching with $30 million in 2006. The firm takes its name from Cantabrigia, the medieval Latin name for Cambridge. It is regulated in the UK by the Financial Conduct Authority. Cantab Capital Partners was acquired by GAM in 2016 and is since part of GAM Systematic. The acquisition was advised by Minix Unternehmensberatung GmbH.

== Funds ==
Cantab's stated investment philosophy is that algorithmic trading can help to overcome cognitive biases inherent in human-based trading decisions, by exploiting persistent statistical relationships between markets. Taking a multi-asset, multi-model approach, the majority of Cantab's traded instruments are liquid futures and forwards, across currencies, fixed income, equity indices and commodities.

Cantab manages two investment funds: the CCP Quantitative Programme (launched 2007, with $30m) and the CCP Core Macro Programme (launched 2013). Both are computer-based algorithmic trading systems, also known as automated trading, black-box trading, algo trading or systematic trading.

In January 2013, Goldman Sachs became a minor investor in Cantab. Kirk is a former Goldman partner; Schlaikjer is a former Managing Director and European Chief Technology Officer of Goldman's Quantitative Strategies Group. Cantab is reported to have been granted access to Goldman's technology infrastructure.

== Performance ==
At the end of December 2014 Cantab's leading fund, the CCP Quantitative Fund, had gained 39.3% over the previous 12 months. The fund gained 13 percent over January 2015 alone. These gains brought the fund to an annualized return of 11.38 percent since inception in March 2007; the Quantitative fund now has $3.5bn in assets under management.

The Financial Times and The Wall Street Journal reported that Cantab's 2014 results took place in the context of renewed investor interest in computer-traded funds and commodities-based funds.

== Fee structure ==
Cantab’s Core Macro Programme is notable for its fee structure, charging a 0.5 per cent management fee and 10 per cent of profits. Industry-standard fees among hedge funds are often 2 percent of assets and 20 percent of profits. Although algorithm-based hedge funds tend to offer lower fees, made possible by their technological infrastructure, The New York Times reported that Cantab had "...lowered the fees to a point that not everybody can afford to do. Some industry experts, such as Robert Leonard of Credit Suisse, believe that such commission levels are unsustainable.

== Employees ==
Cantab is largely staffed by mathematicians and scientists, many of whom have ties to nearby University of Cambridge. In a 2013 interview with the Financial Times, Kirk said “We have made a commitment to investors that we have no plans to be bigger than 80 professionals."

== Cantab Capital Institute for the Mathematics of Information ==
In 2015 Cantab donated £5 million to launch the Cantab Capital Institute for the Mathematics of Information at Cambridge University. The research institute will use mathematical science techniques to analyse data for application in fields such as medicine, meteorology, urban planning and financial risk analysis. The Institute will have six lecturers and up to 18 Ph.D. students.

The Institute was set-up in order to address the lack of philanthropic funding for data research, and to stimulate cutting-edge research in the area. In an interview with Pensions and Investments, Kirk said "...it is much easier to get funding for medical science or computer science [than for] more theoretical subjects like mathematics”. Kirk also characterised the donation as "philanthropic” and that the firm plans to keep its research in-house, while maintaining a "rewarding dialogue" with the Institute.
