= Dick Newell =

British businessman

- Education: Imperial College, London
- Scientific career
- Workplaces: CADCentre; Smallworld; MEDUSA; UltraVision; Imperial College, London
- Thesis: Algorithms for the design of chemical plant layout and pipe routing (1975)
- Website: www.magikbirds.com

Richard G. Newell is a British businessman and technologist in the software industry in Computer aided design (CAD) and Geographic Information Systems (GIS).

== Career ==
Newell holds degrees in Civil Engineering and Numerical Analysis and a PhD in Chemical Engineering from Imperial College, London.

As a software engineer, he worked at CADCentre alongside his brother Martin Newell who is perhaps best known as the creator of the Utah Teapot (or Newell teapot). It was at the centre that Newell oversaw the creation of the successful Plant Design Management System (PDMS) for 3D process plant design. In 1972 Newell, his brother Martin and Tom Sancha proposed the Newell's algorithm procedure.

He co-founded his first company, Cambridge Interactive Systems Ltd. (CIS) in 1977. CIS was part of what became known as 'The Cambridge Phenomenon'. Newell co-founded Smallworld Systems in 1988. The company was successfully floated, on NASDAQ in 1996 and was subsequently sold to General Electric Corporation (GE) in 2000.

Newell held the position of Chairman of both CIS and Smallworld Systems.

He is currently a Non-Executive Director of UltraVision CLPL with business partners J. Keith Lomas and John H. Clamp. He is also a Director of Ubisense and Digital Spring.

Newell has also held a council member position for the British Trust for Ornithology (BTO). In 2016 he received the BTO's Marsh Award for Innovative Ornithology for his work with Action for Swifts.
