= Aveva =

Software company in United Kingdom

AVEVA Group plc
- Type: Subsidiary
- Traded as: LSE: AVV (1996–2023)
- Industry: Industrial Software; Technology consulting Software
- Founded: 1967; 59 years ago in Cambridge, UK
- Headquarters: Cambridge, England, UK,
- Area served: Worldwide
- Key people: Peter Herweck (Chairperson); Caspar Herzberg (CEO)
- Products: CAD/CAM; Enterprise Asset Management; Manufacturing Execution System; Enterprise Solutions; HMI; SCADA
- Revenue: ▲£1,185.3 million (2022)
- Operating income: ▼£(6.5) million (2022)
- Net income: ▼£(62.6) million (2022)
- Total assets: ▲£6,670.5 million (2022)
- Total equity: ▲£5,209.2 million (2022)
- Number of employees: 6,500 (2022)
- Parent: Schneider Electric (2023–present)
- Website: aveva.com

AVEVA Group plc is a British multinational information technology consulting company headquartered in Cambridge, England. The company started as the Computer-Aided Design Centre (or CADCentre) which was created in Cambridge in 1967 by the UK Ministry of Technology and Cambridge University.

It was listed on the London Stock Exchange until it was acquired by Schneider Electric on 18 January 2023.

== History ==
=== Early history ===
The origins of AVEVA start in 1967 in Cambridge, England, with the establishment of the CADCentre, as it was more commonly referred to, and later formally became. It was a government-funded research institute created by the UK Ministry of Technology, with a mission to develop computer-aided design techniques and promote their take-up by British industry. Its first director was Arthur Llewelyn, who initially contracted out the recruitment and management of specialist staff to ICL.

The centre carried out CAD research, and some of its early staff members, such as brothers Dick Newell and Martin Newell, went on to become well known in the worldwide CAD community. Dick Newell oversaw the creation of the Plant Design Management System (PDMS) for the 3D process plant design. He later co-founded two software companies – Cambridge Interactive Systems (CIS) which was known for its Medusa 2D/3D CAD system, and Smallworld with its eponymous Smallworld GIS (Geographical Information System). Martin Newell later went to the University of Utah where he did pioneering 3D solid modelling work; he was also one of the progenitors of PostScript.

CADCentre became a private company in 1983, was the subject of a management buyout in 1994 under the leadership of its first managing director, Dr. Bob Bishop, and became a publicly quoted company in 1996. It changed its name to AVEVA in 2001.

=== Acquisitions ===
- On 21 April 2004, the company acquired Tribon Solutions, a global supplier of the "Tribon" naval architecture software for shipbuilding and marine design, for US$35 million. The acquisition was completed on 19 May 2004. Tribon was originally developed by Kockum Computer Systems (KCS) for designing commercial and naval vessels. KCS was spun off from Kockums shipyards as an independent company, later renamed Tribon Systems. The Tribon family of programs create a common set of databases containing the design details of the ship.
- On 31 March 2005, the company acquired Realitywave, Inc., developers of a web collaboration and streaming platform, for £3.2 million.
- On 30 March 2009, AVEVA announced the acquisition of iDesignOffice Pty Ltd, an instrumentation engineering technology company based in Melbourne, Australia, specialising in products for plant and marine industries.
- On 3 June 2010, AVEVA Solutions Ltd, a wholly owned unit of AVEVA Group plc, announced the acquisition of Logimatic's MARS business from Logimatic Holdings A/S for £12.8 million. This acquisition was completed on 30 June 2010, and MARS products and services were merged into AVEVA's Enterprise Solutions Group and aligned with its flagship AVEVA NET solution.
- On 3 June 2010, AVEVA Solutions Ltd acquired the oil and gas business from ADB Systemer AS, a Sola-based provider of operations integrity management software aimed at owner operators in the oil and gas industry.
- On 3 October 2011, AVEVA announced the acquisition of LFM (Light Form Modeller) software division of Z+F UK Limited, which allowed it to expand into the 3D data capture market.
- On 23 May 2012, AVEVA announced the acquisition of the Belgium and Germany-based Bocad group of companies, a provider of building information modeling software for £14 million. The acquisition strengthened AVEVA's 3D structural detailing capabilities for the plant, marine and construction markets.
- On 17 December 2012, AVEVA announced the acquisition of all assets relating to the advanced visualisation and simulation software of Huntsville, Alabama-based Global Majic Software, Inc.
- On 5 January 2015, AVEVA announced the acquisition of Derry based 8over8 Limited for £26.9 million. 8over8 provides contract risk management software - ProCon - for the oil, gas and mining, and other infrastructure industries.
- On 8 February 2018, AVEVA announced the acquisition of the intellectual property rights of EDD and PDMSi software developed by Shell International Exploration and Production Inc., a member of the Royal Dutch Shell plc group.
- On 5 April 2019, AVEVA announced the acquisition of the software assets of MaxGrip B.V. to extend its Asset Performance Management (APM) solutions.
- On 26 March 2020, AVEVA announced the acquisition of South Korea-based production accounting solution provider MESEnter software to complement its value chain optimisation solution.
- On 25 August 2020, AVEVA announced an agreement to acquire OSIsoft for US$5 billion in one of the largest deals made by a UK-based technology company. The acquisition was completed on 19 March 2021 for a final consideration of £3,831.4 million.

=== Schneider Electric's industrial software business combines with AVEVA ===
On 1 March 2018, AVEVA agreed to merge with France-based Schneider Electric's industrial software business in a multi-step reverse takeover. Schneider Electric became the largest shareholder with a 60% ownership interest.

On 21 September 2022, Schneider agreed to a full takeover of AVEVA by paying about £3.87 billion (US$4.4 billion) for the remaining equity, valuing the whole of AVEVA at around £9.48 billion (US$10.8 billion). The company confirmed that the final day of trading in its shares prior to completion of the takeover would be 17 January 2023. On 18 January Schneider completed the acquisition of AVEVA.

== Stadium ==
In 2019 in Houston, Texas, a new stadium bearing the company's name was inaugurated and became home of the professional rugby team the Houston SaberCats.
