= Smallworld =

Main component of geospatial processing programs suite

- Developer: GE Digital
- Stable release: 5.0 / February 2016
- Operating system: Windows
- Type: GIS software
- License: Proprietary

Smallworld is the brand name of a portfolio of GIS software provided by GE Digital, a division of General Electric. The software was originally created by the Smallworld company founded in Cambridge, England, in 1989 by Dick Newell and others. Smallworld grew to become the global market leader for GIS in 2010 focused on utilities and communications and remains strong in this sector today. Smallworld was acquired by GE Energy in September 2000.

Smallworld technology supports focused application products for telecommunications and utility industries.

== Smallworld GIS Solution Portfolio ==
Smallworld applications are based upon GE's Smallworld Geographic Information System (GIS) and primarily provide industry-focused products for:

- Electric Transmission and Distribution Utilities: Smallworld Electric Office, GIS Adapter
- Telecommunications: Smallworld Physical Network Inventory
- Gas Distribution and Transmission Utilities: Smallworld Gas Distribution Office, Smallworld Global Transmission Office, MAOP
- Water and Wastewater Utilities: Smallworld Water Office

Smallworld GIS is also used by a number of customers outside of these industries to provide the basis for other applications for rail and road transportation. In addition, GE provides a number of cross-industry and integration tools, including:

- GeoSpatial Analysis for geospatial business intelligence with the ability to visualise data from a wide range of spatial and non-spatial data sources such as ESRI Shape files, AutoCAD DWG, Microsoft Excel, etc.
- Smallworld GeoSpatial Server for service-based integration and web mapping
- Mobile Enterprise for field enablement of workflows
- Google Maps integration enables access to Google Maps and Street View directly within the Smallworld applications.
- Integration of Safe’s FME product allowing import and export between other GIS such as Esri ArcGIS, Hexagon Intergraph, Pitney Bowes MapInfo, etc.
- Smallworld Business Integrator enables integration with ERP systems such as SAP and IBM Maximo.
- Smallworld GIS Adapter–provides a tightly integrated mechanism for sharing the as-built network with operational systems.

== Technology ==
GE Digital’s Smallworld GIS platform utilises a number of technologies:

- The 64bit Java Virtual Machine which allows supports development in both Java and Magik (programming language) (an object-oriented programming language that supports multiple inheritance, polymorphism, multi-threading and is dynamically typed).
- A database technology called Version Managed Data Store (VMDS) that has been designed and optimized for storing and analyzing complex spatial and topological data and supports alternative versions of the data during long-transactions to manage the progression of assets through their lifecycle (plan, design, build, operate, maintain).
- A highly-secure and reliable server layer providing web-based access and integration based upon containers and orchestrated by Kubernetes supports streamlining and automating enterprise deployments.
- The solution can be operated on-premise or deployed into the major public cloud providers such as OCI, Amazon AWS, Microsoft Azure and Google Cloud.
