= Multiplan =

Spreadsheet program

- Multiplan on MS-DOS (top) and Commodore 64
- Developer: Doug Klunder of Microsoft
- Release: August 1982; 44 years ago
- Written in: p-code C
- Operating system: CP/M, Apple II, Microbee, Classic Mac OS, MS-DOS, Xenix, Commodore 64, CTOS, TI-99/4A, TRS-80, UNIX, Thomson
- Type: Spreadsheet

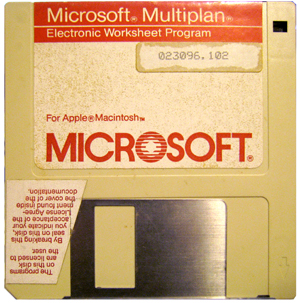
Multiplan floppy disk for Macintosh

Multiplan is a spreadsheet program developed by Microsoft and introduced in 1982 as a competitor to VisiCalc.

Multiplan was released first for computers running CP/M; it was developed on a PDP-11 running Unix using a Microsoft proprietary p-code C compiler as part of a portability strategy that facilitated ports to systems such as MS-DOS, Xenix, Commodore 64 and 128, TI-99/4A (on four 6K GROMs and a single 8K ROM), Radio Shack TRS-80 Model II, TRS-80 Model 4, TRS-80 Model 100 (on ROM), Apple II, AT&T UNIX PC, and Burroughs B20 series. The CP/M version also ran on the TRS-80 Model II and 4, Commodore 128, and Apple II with a CP/M card. In France, Multiplan was also released for the Thomson computers in 1986 and, in the same year, it was released in Japan for MSX compatible computers with the name MSX-Plan.

Despite the release of Microsoft Chart, a graphics companion program, Multiplan continued to be outsold by Lotus 1-2-3. Multiplan was replaced by Microsoft Excel, which followed some years later on both the Apple Macintosh (1985) and Microsoft Windows (1987).

Although over a million copies were sold, Multiplan was not able to mount an effective challenge to Lotus 1-2-3. According to Bill Gates, this was due to the excessive number of ports (there were approximately 100 different versions of Multiplan). He also believed that it was a mistake to release 8-bit versions instead of focusing on the newer 16-bit machines and as a result, "We decided to let [Lotus] have the character-based DOS market while we would instead focus on the next generation–graphical software on the Macintosh and Windows." Around 1983, during the development of the first release of Windows, Microsoft had plans to make a Windows version. However, the plans changed a year later. Microsoft released Microsoft Excel 1.0 in 1985 for the Macintosh, followed by Excel 2.0 for Windows in 1987, which became very popular offerings in the spreadsheet space.

A version was available for the Apple Lisa 2 running Microsoft/SCO Xenix 3. It fit on one 400K microfloppy diskette.

== Cell addressing differences ==
A fundamental difference between Multiplan and its competitors was Microsoft's decision to use R1C1 addressing instead of the A1 addressing introduced by VisiCalc. Although R1C1-style formulae are more straightforward than A1-style formulae – for instance, "RC[-1]" (meaning "current row, previous column") is expressed as "A1" in cell B1, then "A2" in cell B2, etc. – most spreadsheet users prefer the A1 addressing style introduced by VisiCalc.

Microsoft carried Multiplan's R1C1 legacy forward into Microsoft Excel, which offers both addressing modes, although A1 is Excel's default addressing mode.

== Reception ==
In a 1983 evaluation of eight spreadsheets for Heath/Zenith computers, Sextant approved of Multiplan's computation speed and menu structure, finding them comparable to SuperCalc's. While expensive compared to others, the magazine noted that as the only spreadsheet with a 16-bit version already available, upgrading would be simple. Sextant concluded that "If your budget can handle the cost, Microsoft's Multiplan wins this race by a couple of lengths". Ahoy! in 1984 called the Commodore 64 version, distributed by Human Engineered Software, a "professional quality spreadsheet ... There is not enough room in this article to mention all the mathematical operations performed ... Documentation is lengthy but well written". A second review in the magazine noted the limitation of the computer's 40-column screen, but praised the ability to stop any ongoing action. It also praised the documentation, and concluded that "its ease of use and foolproof design make Multiplan an outstanding value". BYTE said that "Multiplan for the Macintosh is a winner", stating that combining other versions' power and features with the Macintosh's graphics and user interface "rivals, and in many ways exceeds, anything else available in the spreadsheet genre".

A 1990 American Institute of Certified Public Accountants member survey found that 7% of respondents used Multiplan as their spreadsheet.

== See also ==
- Symbolic Link (SYLK)
