= Martin Allen (entrepreneur) =

Martin A. Allen (1931–2009) was the chairman, co-founder, president, and largest individual stockholder (2,272,866 shares) of Computervision Corp. Its first product, CADDS-1, was aimed at the printed circuit layout, and 2-D drafting markets.

== Career ==
=== Computervision Corp. ===
Martin (Marty) A. Allen co-founded Computervision Corp. in 1969 with Philippe Villers in Boston, MA. In 1980 he led an effort to create the first Graphics Processing Unit (GPU), build to handle 2-D and 3-D modeling.

=== Retirement ===
Allen netted $34 million when, at age 57, he sold Computervision Corp. to Prime Computer Inc. on 29 January 1988.

== Early life and education ==
Born in Des Moines, Iowa, Allen was raised in California. He attended the University of California, Berkeley and obtained a degree in engineering.
