= Stardent Inc. =

Stardent Computer, Inc. was a manufacturer of graphics supercomputer workstations in the late 1980s. The company was formed in 1989 when Ardent Computer Corporation (formerly Dana Computer, Inc.) and Stellar Computer Inc. merged.

Both of the founding companies had formed in 1985, intending to address different market niches; Stellar concentrated on high-performance workstation type machines, while Ardent developed a custom vector processor that allowed it to compete with large supercomputers for graphics-related tasks. Ardent had considered a workstation entry of their own to compete with Stellar, but the merger ended the need for a second design.

The company was never able to compete successfully with larger vendors and its sales peaked at around $40 million in 1990. The company successfully sold off some of its technologies before being broken up completely in 1994.

== History ==
=== Stellar Computer ===
Stellar Computer was founded in 1985 in Newton, Massachusetts, and headed by William Poduska, who had previously founded Prime Computer and Apollo Computer. This company aimed to produce a workstation system with enough performance to be a serious threat to the Ardent Titan, and at a lower price. Ardent responded by starting work on a new desktop system called Stiletto, which featured two MIPS R3000s (paired with two R3010 FPUs) and four i860s for graphics processing (the i860s replaced the vector units). Their first product was demonstrated in March 1988. An investment from Japanese company Mitsui and others was announced in June 1988, bringing the total capital raised to $48 million.

=== Ardent Computer Corporation ===
At almost the same time, in November 1985, Allen H. Michels and Matthew Sanders III co-founded Dana Computer, Inc. in Sunnyvale, California. The company sought to produce a desktop multiprocessing supercomputer dedicated to graphics that could support up to four processor units. Gordon Bell, who had been architect of the VAX computer, was VP of Engineering. Michels had considered working with Poduska, but founded Convergent Technologies instead, before Ardent.

Each processor unit consisted initially of a MIPS R2000 CPU, and later a R3000, connected to a custom vector processor. The vector unit held 8,192 64-bit registers that could be used in any way from 8,192 one-word to thirty-two 256-word registers. This compares to modern SIMD systems which allow for perhaps eight to sixteen 128-bit registers with a small variety of addressing schemes. The software ran on Unix System V Release 3 with proprietary support for up to four-way SMP and the vector processor. The compiler was based on the Convex Fortran (and C) compiler. Their significant graphics system for visualization was DORE (Dynamic Object Rendering Environment).

Their goal was to release their Titan supercomputer in July 1987 at a $50,000 price point. By late 1986, however, it became clear that this was unrealistic. A second round of funding came from Kubota Corporation, a Japanese heavy industries company, which had cash to spare and was looking for new opportunities during the strong Yen period. Kubota agreed not only to fund the completion of the Titan. but also to provide production facilities in Japan for sales into the Far East. By the time it was finally ready for testing in February 1988, the performance leadership position of Titan had been eroded and the price had risen to $80,000.

In December 1987, Dana changed its name to Ardent Computer after learning about a local disk drive company called Dana Computer.

=== Formation of Stardent ===
The merger of the two rivals, Stellar and Ardent, was announced on August 30, 1989, and completed in November 1989, with Poduska as chief executive. Bell served as chief scientist.

Although the Stardent products were known for their high performance, they also demanded high prices. A 1990 model was quoted at $123,400, for example, although this price was much less than that of the Cray Y-MP.

Kubota is alleged to have forced the merger; in an odd twist, the original Stellar group was left with most of the corporate power. A number of the Ardent employees were less than happy with this move, and quit to form other companies. Others attempted to get Kubota to spin off the original development group as a new company called Comet, but nothing came of this.

In early July 1990, the California portion of Stardent was transferred to the company headquarters in Massachusetts. Co-chairmen Michels and Sanders brought suit against Kubota on July 13 for $25 million in damages, contending that Kubota used its financial leverage over Ardent to force it to merge and then transfer people and technology into a Kubota unit.

On July 24, 1990, Stardent fired co-chairmen Michels and Sanders, after offering a settlement to avoid publicity. In August, the board of directors dismissed Michels and Sanders from the board, and agreed to sell more equity in the company to Kubota for an additional $60 million.

In August 1991, Stardent spun off its popular Application Visualization System (AVS) software into a separate company. In November of that same year, Stardent announced that it would cease to operate under the name Stardent Computer, sell off its Titan workstation operations to Kubota Pacific Computers, find a buyer for its Vistra workstations and create a new company called GS Computer Services to provide maintenance and support for its discontinued GS series workstations it inherited from Stellar. Investors lost an estimated $200 million. The remainder of the company would focus on the AVS software system and the existing shareholders of Stardent would become shareholders of the software firm. By the end of the year, the company had given up on finding a buyer, believed to be Oki Electric, for the Vistra line of workstations but still hoped to sell the underlying graphics technology based on the Intel i860.

Stardent decided to liquidate rather than pursuing new funding from Kubota Corporation. Its sales were estimated at only $40 million in 1990, which limited its ability to compete with other workstation manufacturers such as IBM, HP, and Silicon Graphics. Kubota Pacific cast about looking for direction, before finally settling on a desktop-sized 3D graphics accelerator for the Alpha-based DEC 3000 AXP workstations, called Denali. The company also bought DEC 3000 AXP workstations, packaged them with the Denali, and sold the integrated product as the Kenai workstation. The company changed its name again, becoming Kubota Graphics Company which closed down in 1994.

=== AccelGraphics ===
In 1994, Kubota Graphics was bought by AccelGraphics, the maker of AccelGraphics AG300 and AG500. AccelGraphics in turn was acquired by Evans & Sutherland in 1998.

== Products ==
- Titan workstation
- Vistra workstation

=== Stellar Graphics Supercomputer ===
The Stellar line was called the graphics supercomputer (GS). It was considered an advanced design for the late 1980s.

The Stellar GS workstation family consisted of the GS1000 and GS2000 models. After Stellar merged with Ardent to form Stardent they were sold as the ST1000 and ST2000 models. The GS2000 CPU supported four threads or streams of execution for a total of 20 MIPS and had a vector coprocessor capable of 80 MFLOPS. 16 to 128MB of system memory was supported. 64MB of memory was typical. The four threads were implemented using a Barrel processor design similar to that used in the CDC 6000 series and the Denelcor HEP. The GS2000 graphics subsystem supported interactive 3D rendering at rates of up to 120,000 Gouraud-shaded triangles per second and 600,000 short vectors per second. Texture mapping and antialiasing with an accumulation buffer were also supported. The CPU and graphics system shared the system memory and vector coprocessor.

The GS workstations used the X window system and the 3D hardware was programmed through an X extension known as XFDI (X Floating-point Device Interface). There were bindings for C and Fortran. The display supported 1280 by 1024 resolution at 12 or 24 bits per pixel (in pseudo-color and true-color modes). 12 and 24-bit Z buffers were supported. The GS2000 cabinet was quite large: approximately 30 inches wide by 48 inches tall by 36 inches deep. There was a companion expansion chassis of about the same size which could contain a 9-track tape drive, for example.

== See also ==
- Ardent Window Manager
- Steve Blank Ardent VP of Sales
