= Questar =

Questar may refer to:

- Questar Corporation, a telescope manufacturer
- Questar Corporation (gas company), an energy company
- Questar Entertainment, a home video publisher
- Questar Science Fiction, a publisher of science fiction
- Bull Questar, a line of computer terminals
- Questar, a character in the cartoon Dino-Riders
