= STARSYS =

STARSYS or Starsys may refer to:

- Convergent Technologies Operating System, or STARSYS, a discontinued operating system
- Starsys Research Corporation, acquired by SpaceDev, a spaceflight and microsatellite company
