= Automatix =

Early robotics and machine vision company

Automatix Inc.
- Type: Public (as of 1983)
- Genre: Industrial robots
- Founded: January 1980
- Founder: Victor Scheinman; Phillippe Villers; Michael Cronin; Arnold Reinhold; Jake Dias; Dan Nigro; Gordon VanderBrug; Donald L. Pieper; Norman Wittels
- Headquarters: Billerica, Massachusetts, USA

Automatix Inc., founded in January 1980, was the first company to market industrial robots with built-in machine vision. Its founders were Victor Scheinman, inventor of the Stanford arm; Phillippe Villers, Michael Cronin, and Arnold Reinhold of Computervision; Jake Dias and Dan Nigro of Data General; Gordon VanderBrug, of NBS, Donald L. Pieper of General Electric and Norman Wittels of Clark University.

== Products ==
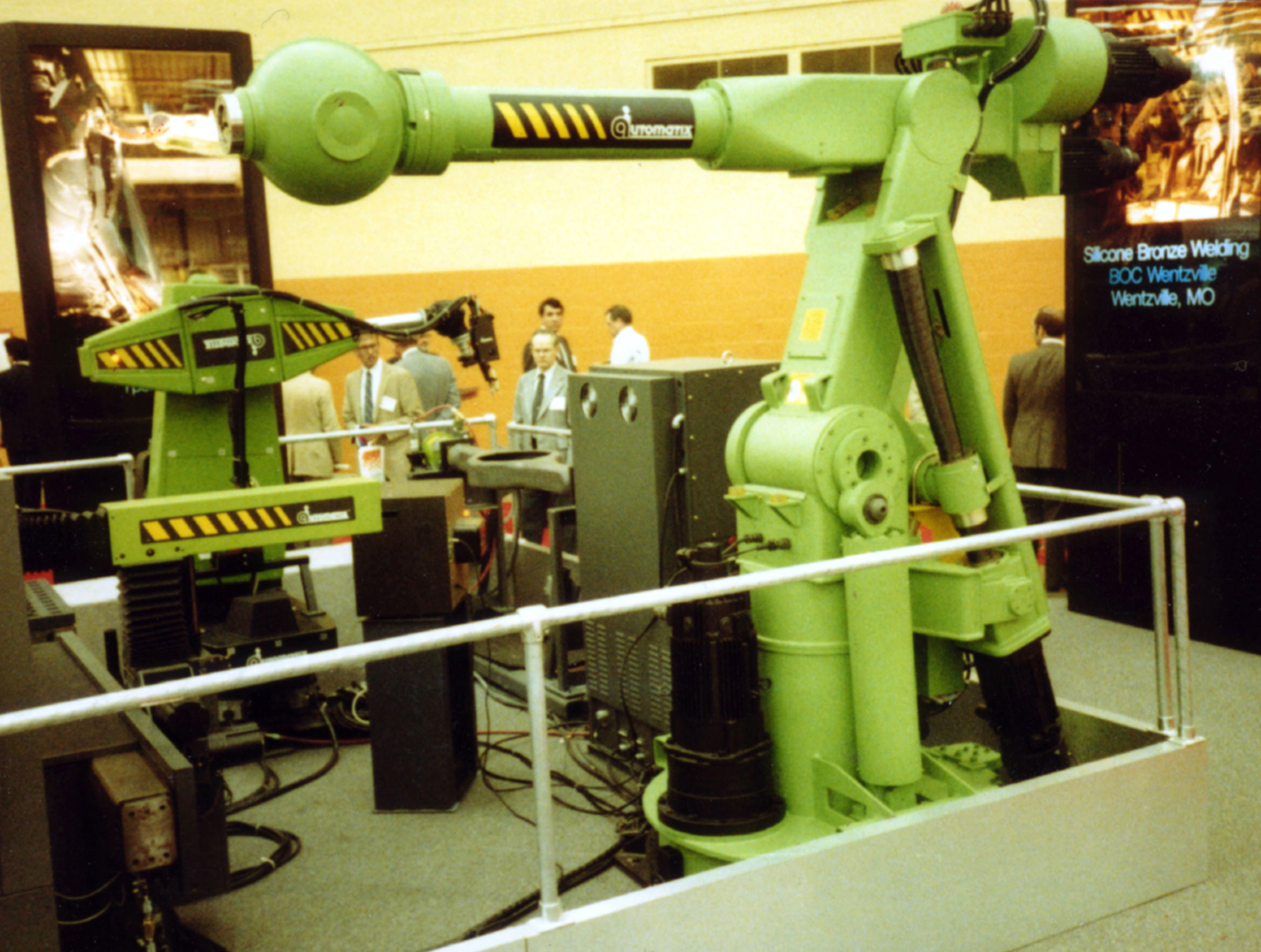
Automatix robots at the Robots '85 trade show in Detroit, Michigan. Clockwise from lower left: AID 600, AID 900 Seamtracker, Yaskawa Motoman.

Initial product offerings included the Autovision machine vision system, the Robovision welding robot and the Cybervision electronic parts assembly system. Automatix was one of the first users of Motorola 68000 microprocessors, but because almost no software existed for the 68000 in 1980, Automatix had to develop its own operating system and a robotics scripting language, called "RAIL". Its initial machine vision offering was based on software and hardware licensed from Stanford Research Institute. In the late 1980s, Automatix replaced the proprietary 68000 computer in its vision products with an Apple Macintosh II.

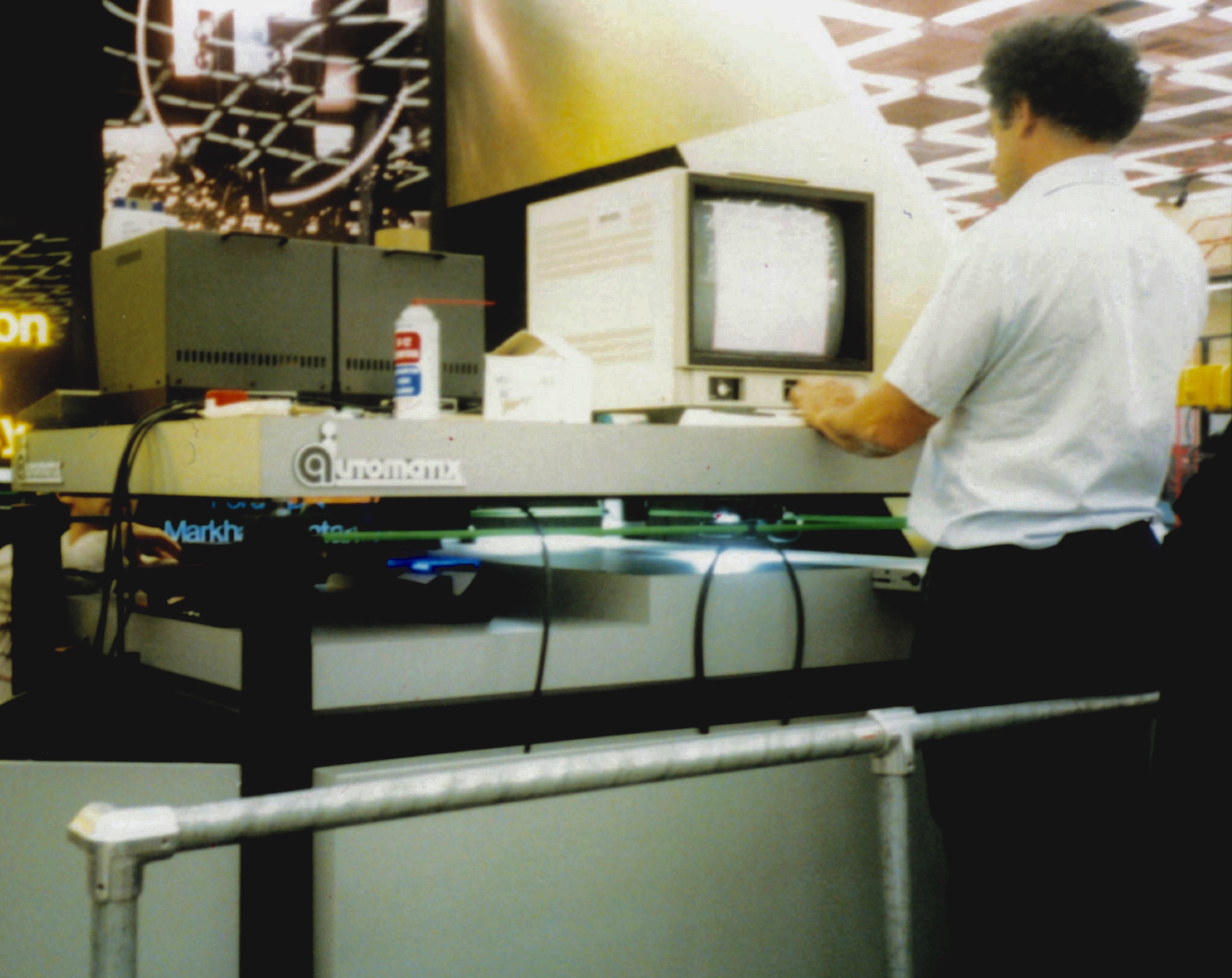
Victor Scheinman setting up his RobotWorld system at the Robots '86 show. Small manipulators and camera sensor modules suspended under the top on a 2-D linear motor grid can move freely to perform assembly operations and other manipulations in the space below.

Automatix mostly used robot mechanisms imported from Hitachi at first and later from Yaskawa and KUKA. It did design and manufacture a Cartesian robot called the AID-600. The 600 was intended for use in precision assembly but was adapted for welding use, particularly Tungsten inert gas welding (TIG), which demands high accuracy and immunity from the intense electromagnetic interference that the TIG process creates. Automatix was the first company to market a vision-guided welding robot called Seamtracker. Structured laser light and monochromatic filters were used to allow an image to be seen in the presence of the welding arc. Another concept, invented by Mr. Scheinman, was RobotWorld, a system of cooperating small modules suspended from a 2-D linear motor. The product line was later sold to Yaskawa.

=== Machine vision systems ===
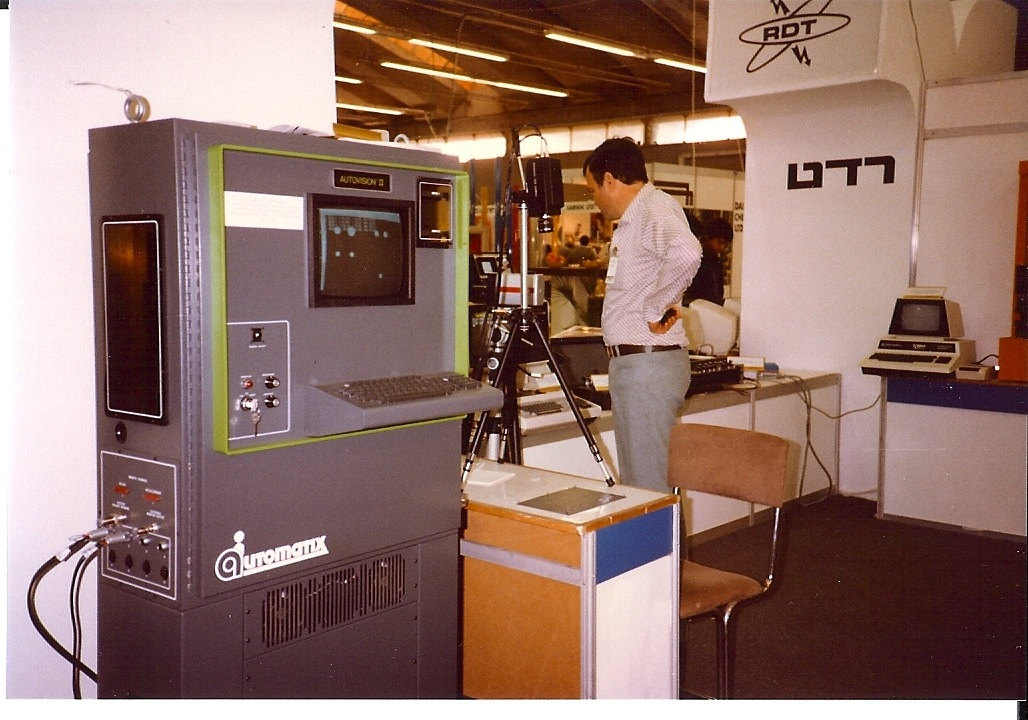
Autovision II machine vision system being demonstrated at the Technology 83 trade show in Israel in 1983. Camera on tripod is pointing down at a light table to produce backlit image shown on screen, which is then subjected to blob extraction.

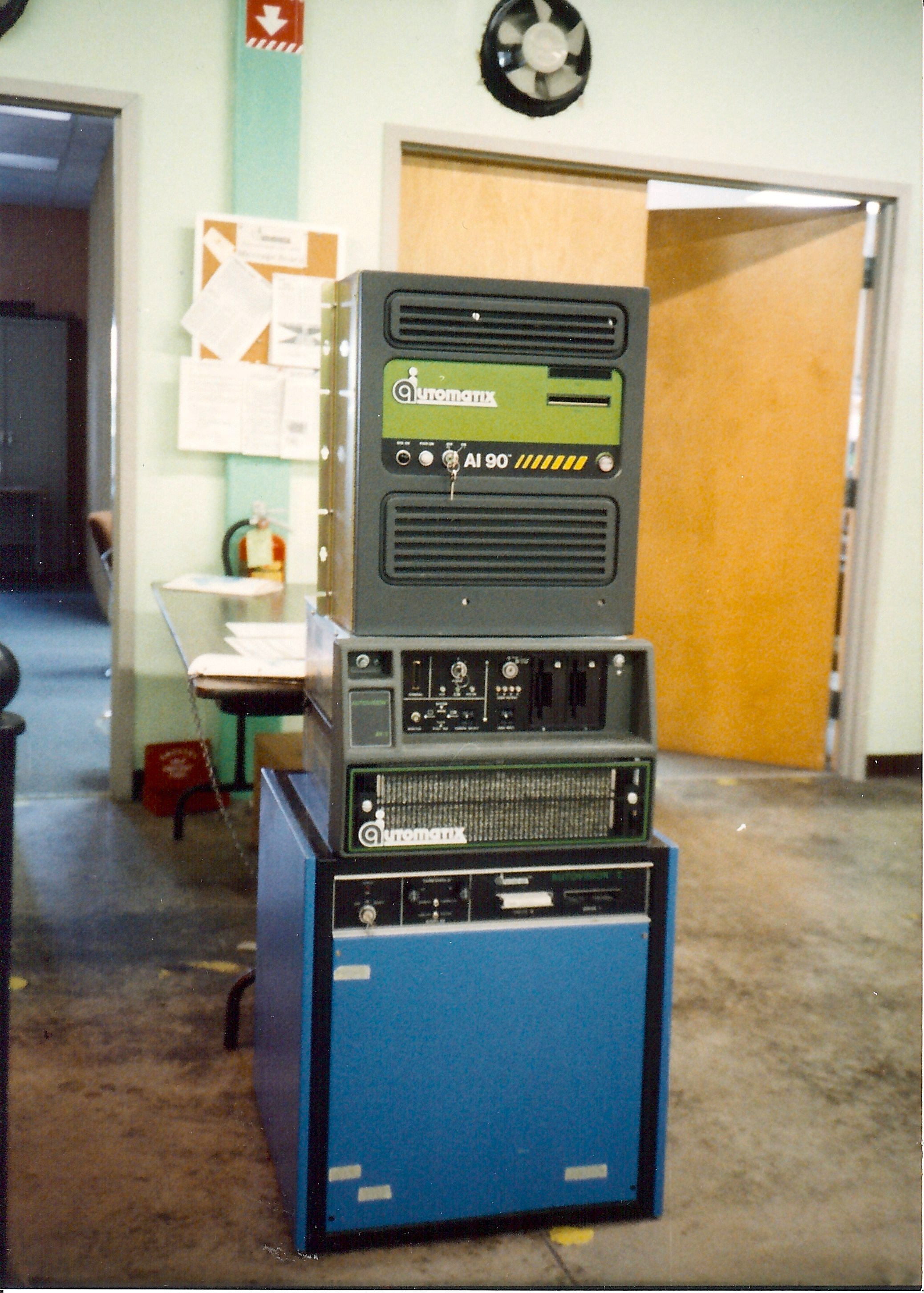
Three generations of Automatix vision systems, AI 90, AV 5 and AV I

Automatix introduced several different machine vision systems during its history:

- Autovision I, 1981, designed for fast time to market, was based on Vision Module technology licensed from Stanford Research Institute (SRI). The AV I used an early Motorola 68000 KDM prototype board interfaced to a Unibus frame grabber board purchased from SRI. The frame grabber was designed for the General Electric TN-2200, an early solid state video camera with a 128 by 128 pixel array and C-mount lens. DECtape II drives were used for program and data storage.
- Autovision II, 1982, used a custom designed Versabus 68000 processor with a custom 8-channel RS-170 Versabus frame grabber employing an AMD Am2900 bit slice micro-controller, packaged in an industrially hardened NEMA-12 enclosure.
- Autovision IV, similar to AV II, but with a patented frame grabber using dual 68000s. Then-new Sony 3 1/2-inch floppy drives replaced DECtape.
- AV 5, same electronics as the AV IV, but in a rack mount package.
- AI 90, 1987, vision system based on an Apple Macintosh II repackaged in a rack mount industrial enclosure, with RAIL ported to Mac OS (MacRAIL). It was announced at the MacWorld Expo in Boston in 1987.
- Autovision 90, a rack mount Apple Quadra 950.
- Image Analyst, a software package for Macintosh computers, based on MacRAIL.

The Automatix AI-32 robot controller used the same processor, bus and RAIL language as the AV II, IV and 5, allowing frame grabber and processing boards to be added for integrated machine vision.

== Evolution and corporate merger ==
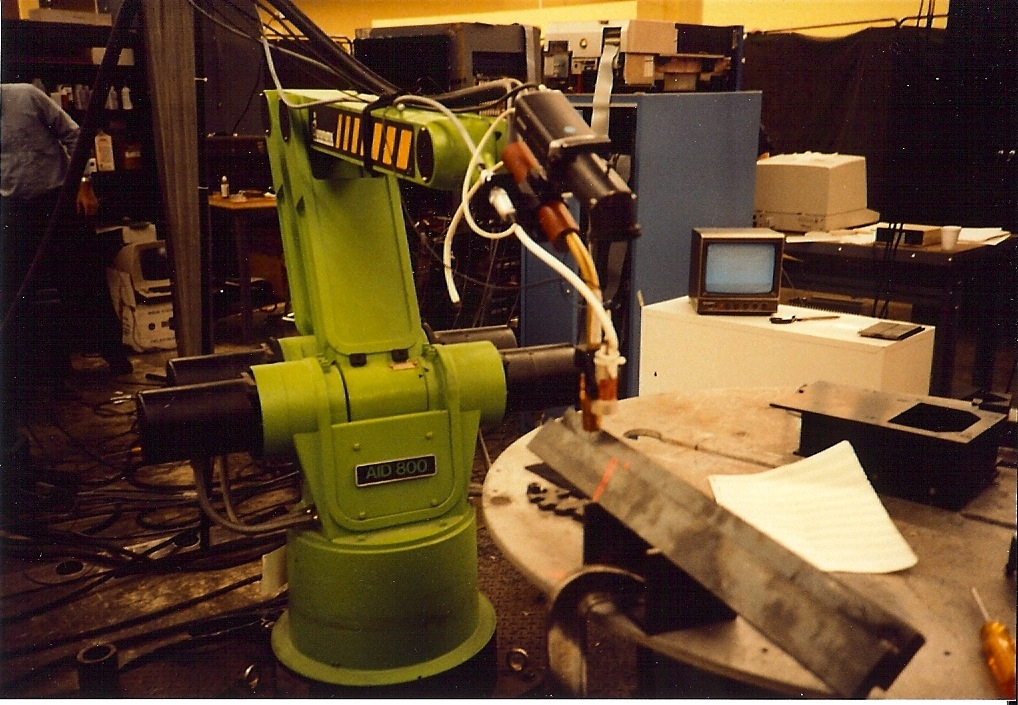
SeamTracker vision-guided arc welding robot under development

Automatix raised large amounts of venture capital, and went public in 1983, but was not profitable until the early 1990s. In 1994, Automatix merged with another machine vision company, Itran Corp., to form Acuity Imaging, Inc. Acuity was acquired by Robotics Vision Systems Inc. (RVSI) in September 1995. Acuity developed the Data Matrix 2-D barcode, after acquiring the rights from International Data Matrix. As of 2004, RVSI supported the evolved Automatix machine vision package under the PowerVision brand.

In August 2005 RVSI itself was acquired by Siemens Energy and Automation who by mid-2008 were marketing the RVSI Visionscape and Hawkeye products alongside their own SIMATIC brand, some of which were re-branded DVT/Cognex smart cameras. In September 2008, Microscan Systems, of Renton, Washington, acquired Siemens' Machine Vision business, including Visionscape and Hawkeye. As of August 2016, the Powervision system developed by Automatix was still available from RPC Machine Vision Systems, a value added reseller of Microscan. Then, in December 2017, Microscan was purchased by Omron Corporation, and its product lines, including MicroHawk and Visionscape, are sold through Omron's distribution network.
