= William Poduska =

American engineer and entrepreneur

Bill Poduska
- Born: John William Poduska; 1937 (age 88–89); Memphis, Tennessee, USA
- Education: Massachusetts Institute of Technology (B.S., Electrical Engineering, 1959; M.S., 1960; D.Sc., 1962)
- Occupations: engineer, businessman, professor
- Known for: founder of Apollo Computer and Prime Computer
- Spouse: Susan Poduska
- Children: Alice Ann Casey, Margo Poduska Kay, John William Poduska Jr., Mary Beth Pandiscio, Lily Ann Poduska

John William Poduska Sr. is an American engineer and entrepreneur . He was a founder of Prime Computer, Apollo Computer, and Stellar Computer. Prior to that he headed the Electronics Research Lab at NASA's Cambridge, Massachusetts, facility and also worked at Honeywell.

Poduska has been involved in a number of other high-tech startups. He also has served on the boards of Novell, Anadarko Petroleum, Anystream, Boston Ballet, Wang Center and the Boston Lyric Opera.

Poduska was elected a member of the National Academy of Engineering in 1986 for technical and entrepreneurial leadership in computing, including development of Prime, the first virtual memory minicomputer, and Apollo, the first distributed, co-operating workstation. Poduska currently serves as a trustee at Bentley University.

Poduska helped develop a time-sharing operating system at NASA that later became the basis for Prime Computer's PRIMOS operating system.

== Education ==
Poduska was born in Memphis, Tennessee. In 1955, he graduated from Central High School in Memphis. He went on to earn a S.B. and S.M. in electrical engineering, both in 1960, from MIT. He also earned a Sc.D. in EECS from MIT in 1962.

== Career ==
- Employment
  - Novell, Inc.
  - Prime Computer, Inc. Founder and VP, R&D
  - Honeywell Inc. Dir, Honeywell Info Sciences Cente
  - Stardent Computer, Inc. President and CEO
  - Cambridge Technology Partners
  - Stellar Computers Inc. Founder, Chairman and CEO
  - Apollo Computer Inc. Founder and Chairman
  - Advanced Visual Systems Inc.

== Awards ==
- Recipient of the McDowell Award, National Academy of Engineering, 1986
