= B20 =

B20 may refer to:

== Aircraft ==
- Blackburn B-20, a 1940 experimental aircraft
- Boeing Y1B-20, A Boeing experimental heavy bomber
- Douglas A-20 Havoc, designated the ZB-20 at the end of its life

== Roads ==
- B20 motorway (Spain), a ring road around Barcelona in Catalonia
- B20 road (Cyprus)

== Other uses ==
- B20 (biodiesel), a mixture composed of 20% of biodiesel with 80% of diesel
- B20 (bronze), bell bronze or bell metal, a kind of bronze used in bells and cymbals
- B20 (New York City bus) serving Brooklyn
- Berezin B-20, a 20 mm caliber autocannon used by Soviet aircraft in World War II
- Honda B20 engine
- Volvo B20 engine
- 20 amp, type B – a standard circuit breaker current rating
- Bravo Two Zero, an eight-man British Special Air Service patrol that was tasked with finding Iraqi Scud missile launchers during the Gulf War
- The designation number assigned to the coupe version of the Lancia Aurelia motorcar, produced between 1951 and 1958
- Sicilian Defense, Encyclopaedia of Chess Openings code
- Boron-20 (B-20 or ^{20}B), an isotope of boron
- Burroughs B20, a line of microcomputers
- Business 20, an offshoot of the G20, which hopes to present a forum for the world's largest companies to discuss global issues
  - B20 Summit, an international summit meeting of delegates from business groups around the world

== See also ==
- B2O:
  - Boron monoxide, a chemical compound with the symbol B_{2}O
  - b2o: an online journal, an American peer-reviewed online journal
