= Art Tait =

American football player (1929–2012)

No. 1, 83
- Position: Defensive end

Personal information
- Born: February 8, 1929; Memphis, Tennessee, U.S.
- Died: February 8, 2012 (aged 83); Shreveport, Louisiana, U.S.
- Listed height: 5 ft 11 in (1.80 m)
- Listed weight: 205 lb (93 kg)

Career information
- High school: Central (Memphis, Tennessee)
- College: Mississippi State

Career history
- New York Yanks (1951); Dallas Texans (1952)

Career statistics
- Games played: 20
- Games started: 18
- Fumble recoveries: 2
- Fumble return yards: 70
- Touchdowns: 2
- Stats at Pro Football Reference

Arthur William Tait (February 8, 1929 – February 14, 2012) was an American football defensive end who played two seasons in the National Football League (NFL) for the New York Yanks and Dallas Texans. He played college football at Mississippi State.

== Early life and education ==
Art Tait was born on February 8, 1929, in Memphis, Tennessee. He attended Central High School in Memphis before playing college football at Mississippi State. In high school, he played football and baseball. After high school he was team captain for three seasons. He lettered from 1946 to 1950. In 1947, he won the Golden Glove award as a boxer. In 1950 he was named Most Valuable Player in the Blue–Gray Football Classic (college all-star game).

== Professional career ==
After going unselected in the 1951 NFL draft, Tait was signed as an undrafted free agent by the New York Yanks. In the first game of his career, against the Los Angeles Rams, he returned a fumble 30 yards for his first career touchdown. He would do it again just 2 weeks later, scoring a 40-yard return against the Chicago Bears. In his first year, Tait started all 12 games, recording two fumble returns for 70 yards and two scores. His 70 fumble return yards and two fumble return scores would lead the league. When the Yanks folded in 1952 after a 1–9–2 record, he joined the newly formed Dallas Texans. He had a lesser role with them, playing in 8 games, and making six starts. The Texans would fold the next season, ending Tait's professional career.

== Later life and death ==
After his professional career Tait worked for Chrysler for over 45 years. He was appointed to the Louisiana Vehicle Commission by Edwin Edwards and served as the Board Chairman for 12 years. He was later named "Dealer of the Year" in Louisiana.

Afterwards he lived in Shreveport for 36 years. Tait died there on February 14, 2012, at the age of 83. It was just six days after his 83rd birthday.
