= Margaret Valiant =

- Born: February 22, 1901
- Died: April 11, 1982 (aged 81)
- Occupations: Musician, Folklorist, Ethnomusicologist, Activist
- Employer(s): Resettlement Administration, National Youth Administration

Margaret Valiant (February 22, 1901 – April 11, 1982) was an American musician, folklorist, ethnomusicologist and activist.

== Early life ==
Margaret Valiant was born on February 22, 1901, in Como, Panola County, Mississippi, to Denton Hurlock Brahan and Johnnie C. Everson Brahan. Valiant's mother died when she was two. She briefly lived with an aunt in San Antonio, but returned to Mississippi to live with a cousin. Her father was unable to care for her due to mental illness. Valiant moved to Memphis in 1914 after the death of her cousin.

Valiant graduated from Memphis's Central High School in 1918. She studied piano in Memphis and continued her studies at the Cincinnati Conservatory where she received a degree in music in 1922.

Valiant studied acting, singing and languages in Europe where she met Edwin Mims Jr. The couple married in 1927 and divorced in 1932. Valiant split her time between Europe and New York, but returned to New York full-time in 1935. She worked as a model for Chanel in Paris and was the understudy for the lead female role in the 1928 Broadway musical The Three Musketeers which was produced by Florence Ziegfeld.

== Career ==
Valiant was hired by the Special Skills Division of the Resettlement Administration and worked with Charles Seeger to coordinate festivals and music and arts programs in planned Resettlement Administration communities. Valiant kept a field journal when working in the planned community of Cherry Lake Farms, Florida. The journal was later published as Journal of a Field Representative. In 1939, Valiant became an organizer for the National Youth Administration music program and was based in Washington, D.C. During this time, she advocated for women's rights and developed a friendship with Eleanor Roosevelt.

Valiant returned to Memphis in the 1950s and became a civil rights activist.

== Death and legacy ==
Valiant died on April 11, 1982, in Memphis.

Valiant's papers from her time with the Resettlement Administration and the National Youth Administration, including correspondence with Eleanor Roosevelt, are held in the collections of Mississippi State University.

Recordings from her time in the field are held by the Library of Congress.
