= WordMARC =

Word processing software

WordMARC Composer was a scientifically oriented word processor developed by MARC Software, an offshoot of MARC Analysis Research Corporation (which specialized in high end Finite Element Analysis software for mechanical engineering). It ran originally on minicomputers such as Pr1me and Digital Equipment Corporation VAX. When the IBM PC emerged as the platform of choice for word processing, WordMARC allowed users to easily move documents from a minicomputer (where they could be easily shared) to PCs.

WordMARC was the creation of Pedro Marcal, who pioneered work in finite element analysis and needed a technical word processor that both supported complex notations and was capable of running on minicomputers and other high-end machines such as Alliant and AT&T.

WordMARC was originally known as MUSE (MARC Universal Screen Editor), but the name was changed because of a trademark conflict with another company when the product was ported to the IBM PC.

== Features ==
In comparison with WordPerfect—which WordMARC compared itself against, with the headline "WordPerfect Ain't"—WordMARC's formatting metadata is always hidden. This was considered friendlier to novice users, and less likely to result in mangled documents.

Although it was billed as a WYSIWYG system, it does not provide for display of proportional fonts. It does allow the use of proportional fonts by adjusting the margins based on the current text size using an estimated average character width in version 1. Primeword v2 has font character width tables, and a utility that can generate them from HP font files.

Advanced features include Document Assembly (maintaining each chapter of a book in separate files and combining them for printing or to produce a table of contents or index), automatic paragraph numbering, footnotes, endnotes, support for mixed fonts, multi-level equations and scientific characters.

An early version offers support for Japanese characters. The Unix version of WordMARC supports PostScript.

== Company history ==
In 1999 the company became MSC Software and in May was purchased by MacNeal-Schwendler Corp.
