= Computervision =

Early company in Computer Aided Design and Manufacturing

Computervision, Inc.

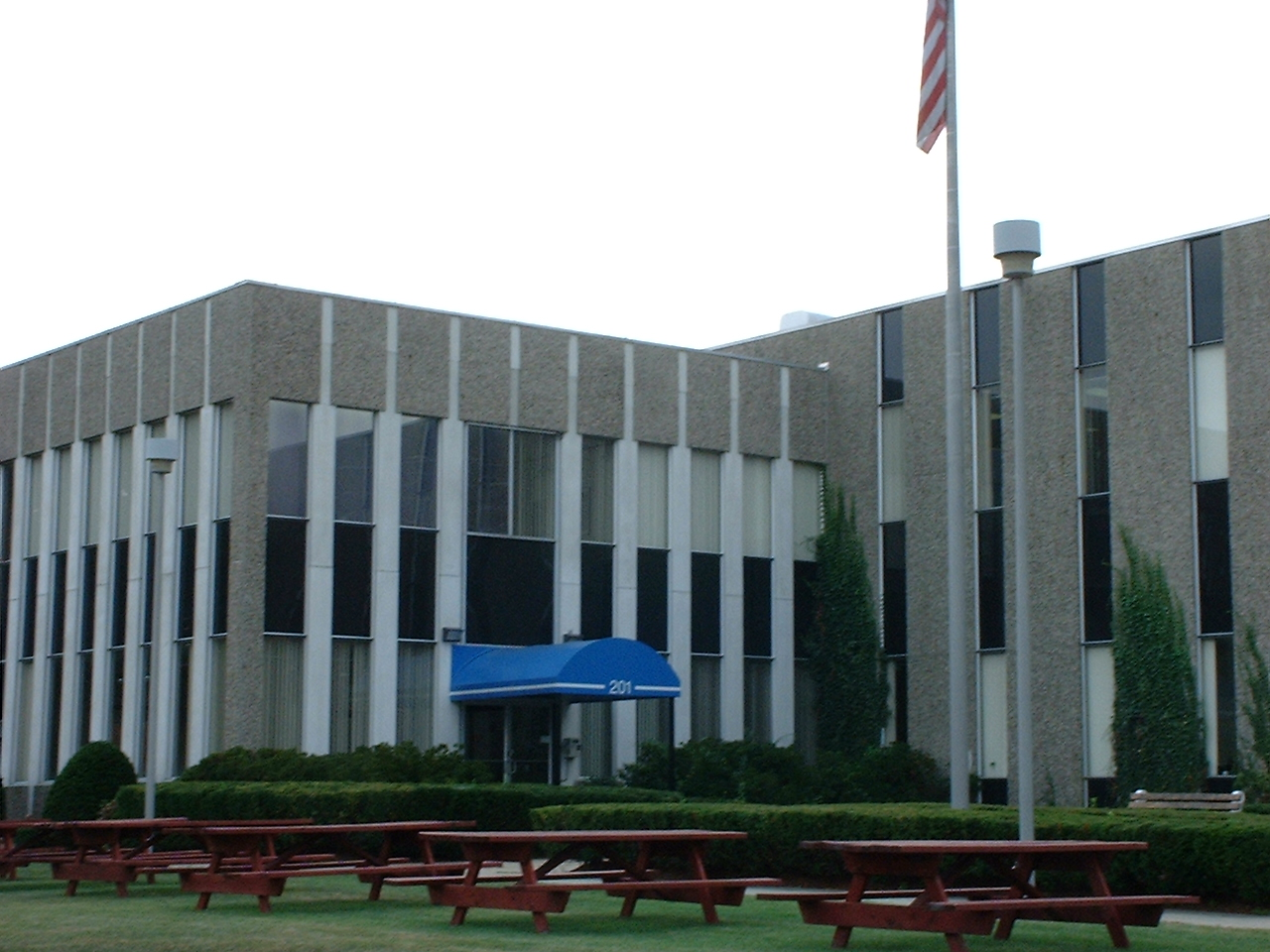
- Headquarters at 201 Burlington Road in Bedford, Massachusetts
- Founded: 1969; 57 years ago
- Founders: Marty Allen, Philippe Villers
- Defunct: December 12, 1998; 27 years ago
- Fate: Merged with Prime Computer
- Headquarters: Bedford, Massachusetts, United States
- Products: CAD/CAM
- Website: cv.com at the Wayback Machine (archived 1996-12-21)

Computervision, Inc. (CV) was an early pioneer in Computer Aided Design and Manufacturing (CAD/CAM). Computervision was founded in 1969 by Marty Allen and Philippe Villers, and headquartered in Bedford, Massachusetts, United States. Its early products were built on a Data General Nova platform. Starting around 1975, Computervision built its own "CGP" (Computervision Graphics Processor) Nova-compatible 16-bit computers with added instructions optimized for graphics applications and using its own operating system known as Computervision Graphic Operating System (CGOS). In the 1980s, Computervision rewrote its code to operate on Unix-based platforms.

Computervision was acquired by Prime Computer in 1988 for $434 million. Prime subsequently adopted the Computervision name. On December 12, 1998 Parametric Technology Corporation acquired Computervision.

== CADDS product history ==
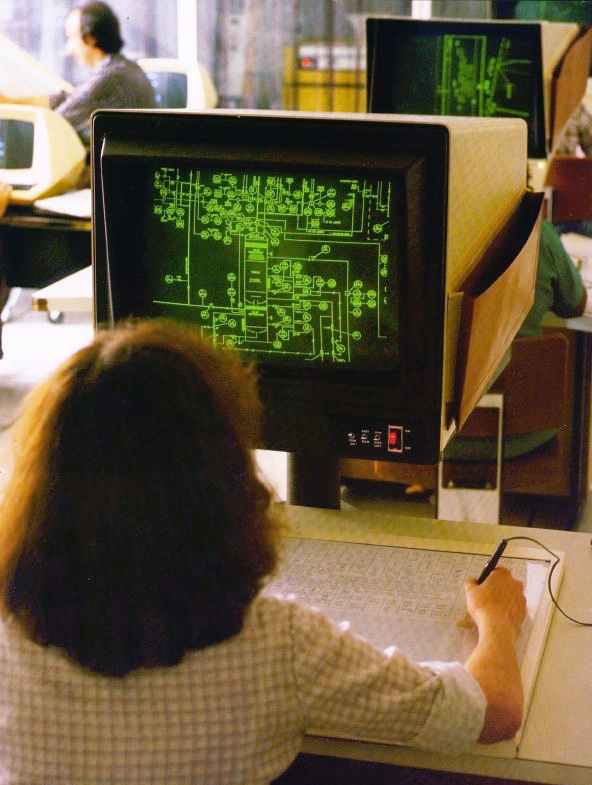
A Computervision Inc. CADDS3 system being used to create a piping and instrumentation diagram in a training lab, circa 1979.

Computervision's first product, CADDS-1, was aimed at the printed circuit board layout and 2-D drafting markets. CADDS stood for Computervison Automated Design and Drafting System. The CADDS-1 system featured a combination digitizer and plotter mounted on a large drafting table.

Integrated circuit layout was added with the CADDS-2 product, which had a dedicated operating system and a 16-bit graphic database. When this proved insufficient resolution for VLSI (very large scale integration), the company developed CADDS-2/VLSI in the late 1970s. CADDS-2/VLSI included a new operating system, a 32-bit database, and user expandability through a dedicated programming language called ICPL (integrated circuit programming language), which was a dialect of BASIC, based on an interpreter licensed from Fairchild Semiconductor. The original CADDS-2 ran on Data General Nova 1200 computers. CADDS-2/VLSI ran on Computervision's own hardware/software which was a modified Data General Nova with a modified version of DG's RDOS operating system.

CADDS3 was introduced in the late 1970s on the CGP80 and CGP100 using Tektronix storage tube vector devices as display terminals and graphics tablets with menus for operator input. CADDS3 was written in Fortran and based on software developed by Patrick Hanratty and acquired from S^{3} Corporation around 1973. In 1975, Computervision introduced an improved database that allowed additional entities and data types to be introduced easily. Other improvements, including a B-spline package and improved refresh performance led to adoption by many large customers, including Boeing, which purchased dozens of systems for the 757/767 aircraft program.

Improved 3D design was added in the early 1980s with the CADDS4 product on the CGP200. This version of CADDS moved display technology from storage tube base displays to raster graphics and introduced the dedicated graphics co-processor board known as the Graphics Processing Unit (GPU).

With CADDS4, tailored packages were available for CAD drafting, CAM (computer-aided manufacturing), 3D modeling, piping and plant design, printed circuit board layout, instrument panel design, and many other applications. During this period, they also contributed to the development of the IGES standard for CAD/CAM data exchange, along with Applicon and other competitors.

The major breakthrough in 3D design was with the CADDS4X on the CGP200X running CGOS200X. This version of the operating system and hardware improved memory management (not true virtual memory) and increased program size. In 1984 a cluster of CGP200X with a proprietary 32-bit processor Analytic Processing Unit (APU) was offered as the Computervision Distributed System (CDS) 4000. The APU was sometimes called "All Paws Up".

CADDS production continued into the twenty-first century. As of 2019, CADDS (now at version CADDS5) was offered as a CAD/CAM system specialized for shipbuilding.

== MEDUSA product history ==
In 1983 Computervision purchased Cambridge Interactive Systems (CIS), founded by British computer scientist Dr. Dick Newell and Tom Sancha. Computervision was interested in obtaining some of the state-of-the-art technology of the MEDUSA CAD system the Cambridge company had developed. CIS had a partnership with Prime Computer which maintained its option on the MEDUSA source code. At the time, MEDUSA was available on the then newly released 32-bit so-called super mini computers, whose most prominent distributors were Digital Equipment Corporation (DEC) (with its VAX hardware) and Prime Computer. In 1984 there was a fork in MEDUSA as Prime took its option to keep developing MEDUSA. This in effect created two different versions of MEDUSA: CIS MEDUSA (owned by Computervision, which ran on Prime, Sun and VAX workstations) and Prime MEDUSA (which only ran on Prime computers at the time of acquisition, but which Prime subsequently ported to SunOS as Prime MEDUSA version 5.0). The two versions had a slightly different file format and the development language was developed in slightly different directions. The split in MEDUSA development was merged when Prime Computers acquired Computervision, with the promise to CV customers that VAX and Sun users would not be forced to switch to Prime workstations.

Prime was divided into the two main divisions: Prime Hardware, which was responsible for the proprietary computer hardware, and Prime Computervision, which was responsible for the CAD/CAM business with MEDUSA and CADDS. With falling hardware sales Prime eventually stopped production of PRIMOS computers and transferred its maintenance obligations to another company, thus being able to concentrate on the CAD/CAM software business. The company was renamed from Prime Computervision to Computervision (CV).

== Hardware ==
Computervision created a GPU, Graphics Processing Unit, in 1980. It could traverse and render hierarchical display lists. It also produced a DCU, Display Control Unit, in 1983 with a large color raster display and attached rendering engine for basic UI operations.

In 1985, CV introduced an IBM 4361-based mainframe known as the CDS5000 to support Product Data Manager (PDM). This system never ran any graphics software but instead was used to manage the large number of product files and data that users were generating. The CDS5000 was networked with CDS4000 and CGP200X systems using serial links. PDM was later made platform independent and was offered on the original IBM platform, as well as DEC/VMS and Sun/Unix - opening up its CADDS workstations to run in conjunction with this range of host platforms for product data vaulting, access/security, revision control, backup/recovery, archive/restore features.

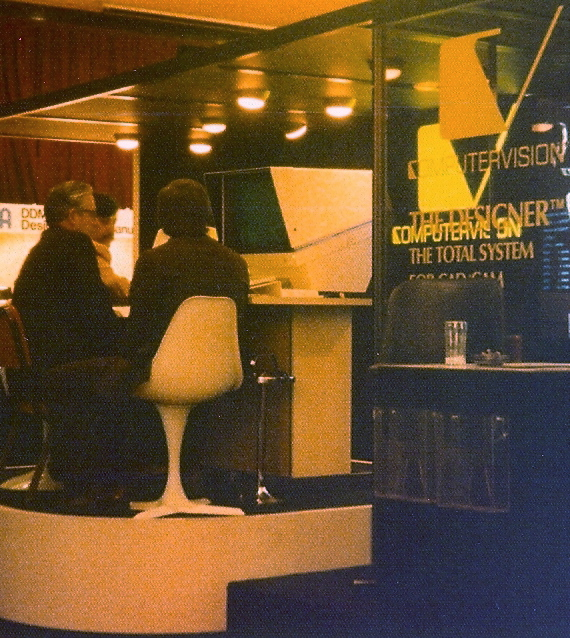
Computervision CADDS system exhibited at a trade show in 1978.

Computervision was crucial to Sun Microsystems development as a company. CV was Sun's first large customer for Unix-based workstations. The CDS3000 series of workstations were actually Sun-2 systems with additional graphics hardware from CV. Ultimately in 1987, CV migrated from the CGP systems to Sun-3-based workstations known as CADDStations with a VME bus version of the GPU.

Computervision merged with Prime Computer in 1988 and acquired GE Calma (its major competitor in the microelectronic CAD market) in 1989. Computervision was acquired by Parametric Technology Corporation (PTC) in 1998, which (as of 2013) still produces the CADDS5 product, although only as a CAD/CAM product specialized for shipbuilding. In 2001, PTC sold the MEDUSA and MPDS Plant Design System software rights to CAD Schroer, which has developed a Fourth Generation of each system.

== Customers ==
One of the first major customers in the UK for ComputerVision were the construction company John Laing PLC.

"In 1975 John Laing purchased a ComputerVision CADDS3 computer aided design and drafting system to carry out investigations into the use of CAD in the construction engineering and building environment" - Mervyn Richards, Laing Technology Group (Thomas Telford Press, Institute of Civil Engineers, Conference - ISBN 0-7277-1340-X )

Laing Design Partners, a division of John Laing, had for some time been sponsoring work at Imperial University on the use of CAD in construction in the early 1970s and this led to Laing choosing the ComputerVision platform.

At this time, Laing became the first CAD user in the UK Civil Engineering and Construction industry and were instrumental in developing and promoting the use of Computers in Construction.

Mervyn Richards, responsible for this initiative later became one of the industries leading experts in Computer Aided Design, Modeling and construction IT (see the BS1192 specification). His work with CADDS3, ComputerVision and Elstree Computing Limited lead to the development and distribution of many software tools for ComputerVision platforms, promoting their use and popularising the platform for many years - right up to CADDS5.

The Queen Alia Airport, by example, was a classic project to which these systems were used (by John Laing PLC).

The first higher educational user of Computervision equipment was State University of New York College of Technology at Alfred, New York which acquired a CADDS3 system in 1979 with the help of a NSF grant and generous donation of equipment by Computervision employees Virgil Ross, Drew Davis and Bob Gothie. Alfred State graduated its first AAS Computer Graphics Engineering Technology (TAC/ABET) Graduates in 1983 with Martin Allen as the featured graduation speaker. The first graduating class of 18 students had over 75 job offers, launching a 20-year history of unparalleled placement success. One of the numerous "firsts" that was spun off the Alfred State program was a joint project with the New York State Department of Transportation, Region 6, to design highways and bridges and associated structures in 3D CADDs which resulted in New York State being one of the first to use CADDS for highway design.

In 1981 the United States Navy awarded an “indefinite quantity, indefinite delivery contract valued at $63,000,000 for Designer V hardware, CADDS4 software, services, and training. Primarily used by the Navy Laboratories, in the 1985 time frame, CADDS was adopted by the Navy shipyards to support waterfront activities, and the Naval Sea Systems Command to support contract ship design. As of 2013, CADDS (by then CADDS5) continued in production as a CAD/CAM product specialized for shipbuilding.

== See also ==
- Comparison of CAD Software
