= John S. Bull =

U.S. Navy test pilot, engineer and astronaut (1934-2008)

John Bull
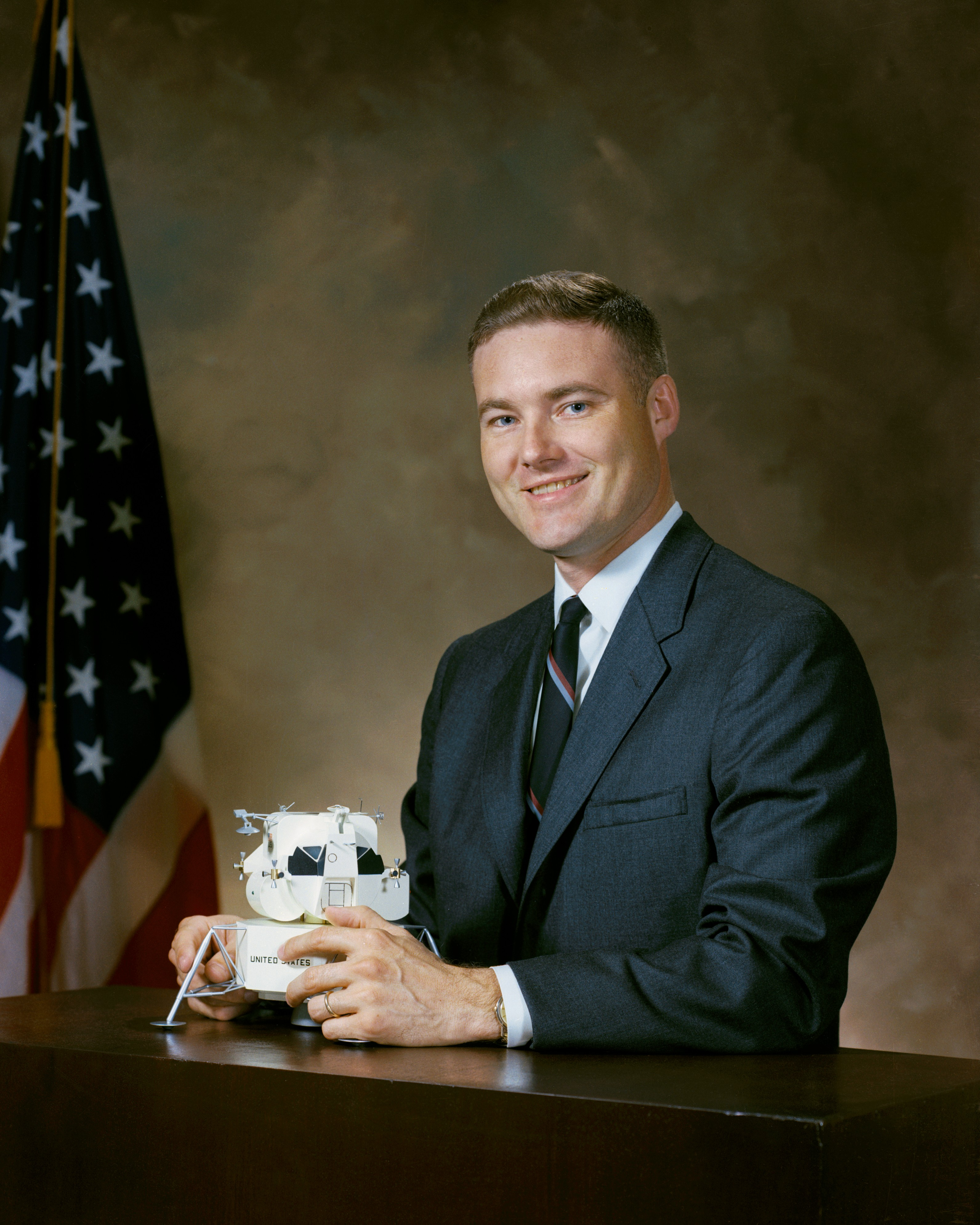
- Portrait of Bull
- Born: John Sumter Bull; September 25, 1934; Memphis, Tennessee, U.S.
- Died: August 11, 2008 (aged 73); South Lake Tahoe, California, U.S.
- Education: Rice University (BS); Stanford University (MS, PhD)
- Space career

NASA astronaut
- Rank: Lieutenant Commander, USN
- Selection: NASA Group 5 (1966)
- Retired: July 16, 1968
- Scientific career
- Fields: Aeronautical engineering
- Thesis: Precise Attitude Control of the Stanford Relativity Satellite (1973)

John Sumter Bull (September 25, 1934 – August 11, 2008), was an American naval officer and aviator, fighter pilot, test pilot, mechanical and aeronautical engineer, and NASA astronaut.

== Biography ==
=== Early life and education ===
Bull was born on September 25, 1934, in Memphis, Tennessee, where he attended primary and secondary schools and graduated in 1952 from Central High School. He received a Bachelor of Science degree in mechanical engineering from Rice University in 1957. Bull took leave from working at NASA Ames to earn a Master of Science and Ph.D. degrees from Stanford University in Aeronautical Engineering in 1971 and 1973, respectively.

In his youth, he was active in the Boy Scouts of America.

=== Navy service ===
Bull joined the U.S. Navy in June 1957. Following his flight training, from March 1959 to November 1960, he flew the F-3 Demon and F-4 Phantom II while assigned to VF-114 at the Naval Air Station in Mirimar, California. Bull was a Navy fighter pilot with the VF-114 squadron aboard the aircraft carriers USS Ranger, USS Hancock, and USS Kitty Hawk.

Bull graduated from the U.S. Naval Test Pilot School in February 1964, as an outstanding graduate. He was a project test pilot in the Carrier Suitability Branch at the Naval Air Test Center at Patuxent River, Maryland, at the time of his astronaut selection.

He logged more than 2,100 hours flying time; 1,800 hours in jet aircraft.

=== NASA career ===
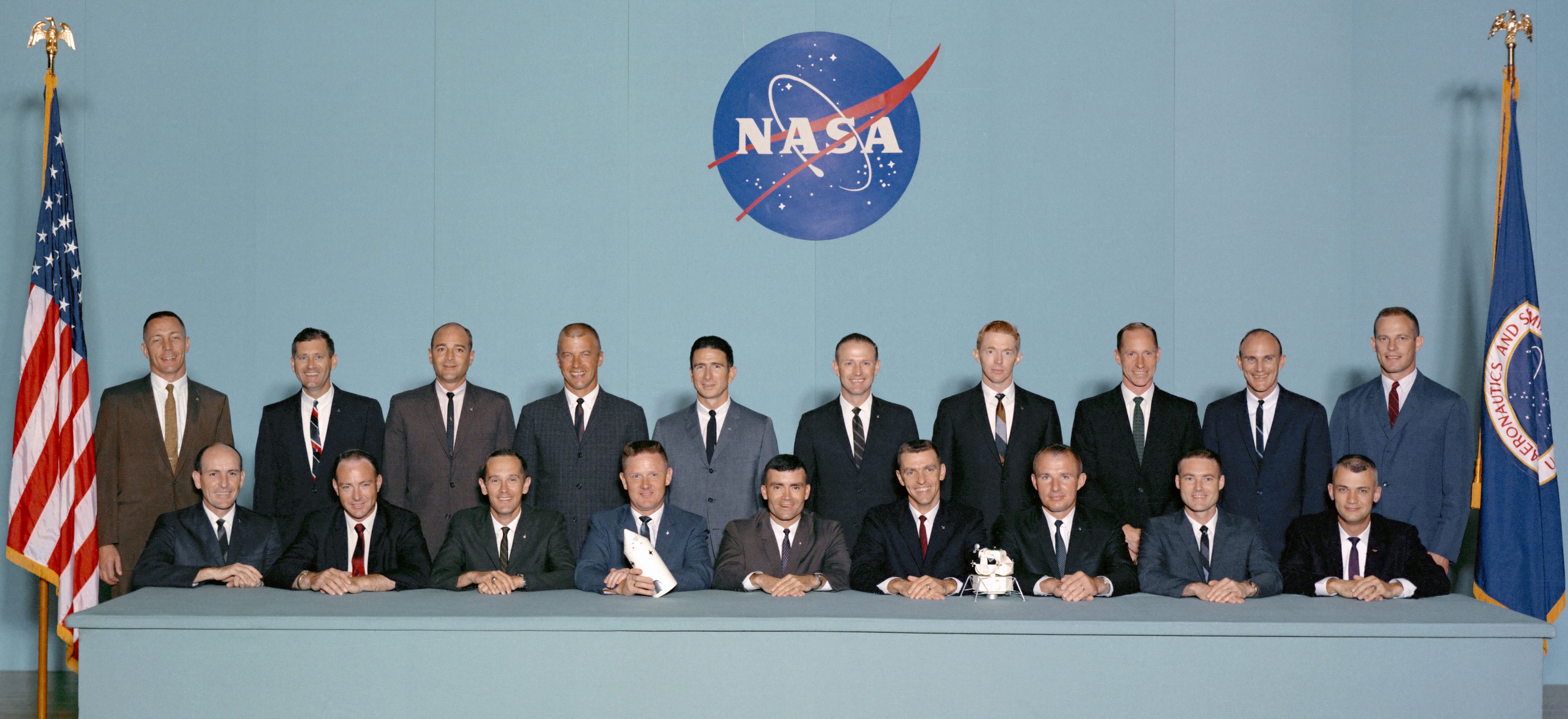
Bull (sitting row, 2nd from right), with his class of 19 astronauts selected in 1966

Bull was selected in 1966 as a member of NASA Astronaut Group 5. Together with Ken Mattingly and Gerald Carr, Bull was named on November 20, 1967, to the support crew for the second Apollo crewed flight of the Saturn V, Apollo 8, to assist prime and backup crew members as they trained. Bull was also chosen as Lunar Module Pilot, with James Irwin as Commander, for LTA-8, an environmental qualification test of the Apollo Lunar Module in a vacuum chamber at the Houston Space Environment Simulation Laboratory. Just before the May–June 1968 test, Bull was found to have a severe sinus problem, and was replaced with his backup, a Grumman consulting pilot. Bull was subsequently diagnosed as suffering from pulmonary disease, and resigned from the astronaut corps in July 1968. Following his retirement, he received a job at NASA Ames.

After receiving his Ph.D., Bull returned to NASA and worked at the Ames Research Center from 1973 to 1985, where he conducted simulation and flight test research in advanced flight systems for both helicopters and fixed-wing aircraft. Around 1983, he became chief of the Aircraft Systems Branch. From 1986 until his retirement from NASA in 1989, he managed NASA-wide research programs in autonomous systems technology for space applications. He continued working with Ames as a consultant until his final retirement in 1997.

=== Personal life ===
Bull was married to the former Nancy Laraine Gustafson of Seattle, Washington, with two sons and a daughter: Jeffrey Tyler (July 27, 1965 – January 28, 1977), Scott A. (born December 30, 1968) and Whitney A. (born August 1, 1971), and four grandchildren.

=== Illness and death ===
Bull died on August 11, 2008, at the age of 73 in South Lake Tahoe, California, due to complications related to long-term asthma.

== Organizations ==
Bull was a member of the Society of Experimental Test Pilots, Sigma Tau Engineering Fraternity, Tau Beta Pi Engineering Fraternity, Sigma Xi, American Helicopter Society, and American Institute of Aeronautics and Astronautics.
