= Philippe Villers =

American businessman

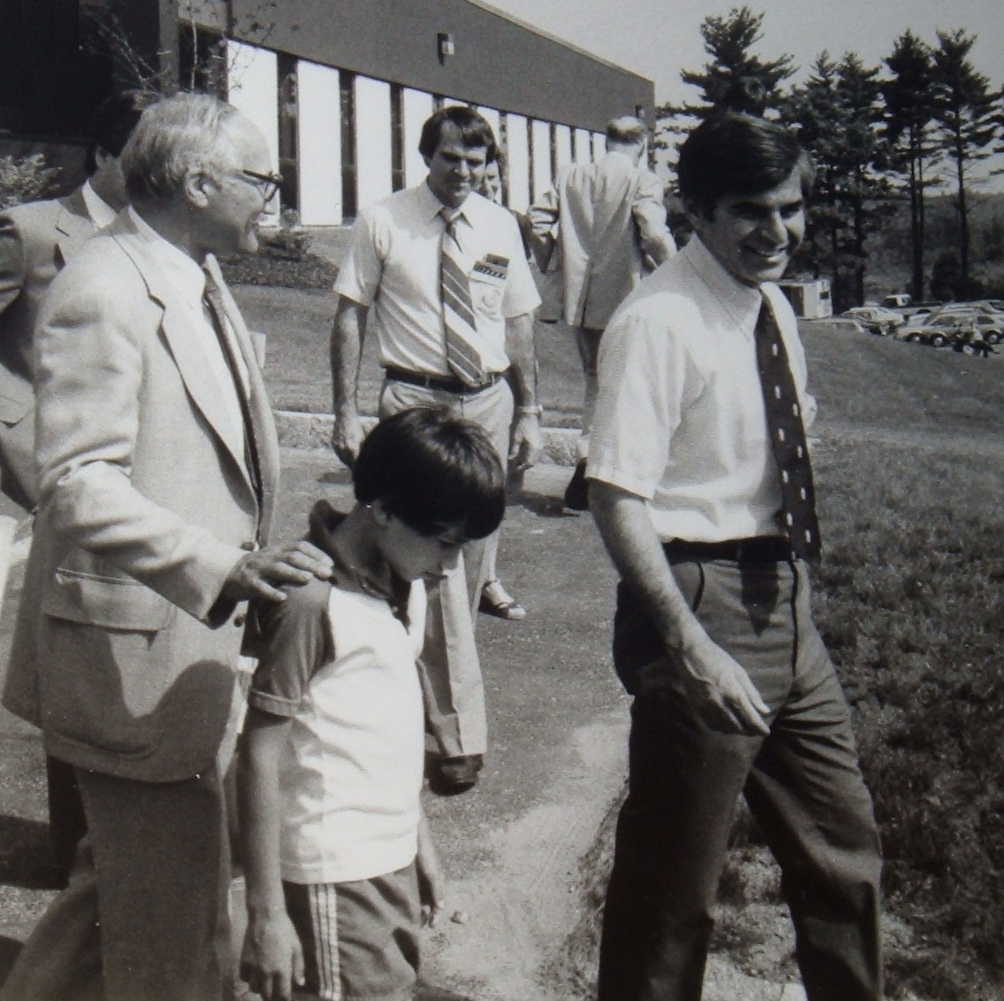
- Villers (left) and then Massachusetts Governor Michael Dukakis at the dedication of the new Automatix plant in Billerica, Massachusetts in 1983
- Education: Harvard University B.A. MIT S.M.
- Occupation: Businessman

Philippe Villers is a French-born American entrepreneur and technology executive known for founding Computervision and co-founding the robotics company Automatix. He has also held leadership roles in several technology firms and nonprofit organisations, including GrainPro, Inc. and Families USA Foundation.

== Early life and education ==
Villers was born in France and came to the United States as a child. He earned a B.A. from Harvard University and an S.M. in mechanical engineering from MIT in 1960. He also holds an honorary doctorate from the University of Massachusetts Lowell.

== Career ==
Villers founded the company Computervision with Marty Allen in 1969.

In 1981, he and his wife founded the organisation, initially known as the Villers Foundation, which later became Families USA. He has served as its president and as a member of its board of directors since its inception.

In 1980, he co-founded Automatix, an early robotics company, which he led until 1986.

He later served as president of Cognition Corporation for 3 years. As of 2013, he was president of GrainPro, Inc., and a board member of several high-tech startups. GrainPro makes bags and storage cocoons out of polyvinyl chloride to protect grain in third world countries, where up to 25% of harvested crops are lost to insects and rodents.

He also serves on the ACLU President’s Committee and Amnesty International USA Executive Directors Council, and sits on the boards of Cambridge Innovations, Conflict Management Group, QuitNet, and Voxiva.
