= Advent Online Knowledge =

American software company

Advent Online Knowledge, Inc.
- Industry: software
- Headquarters: Schaumburg, Illinois
- Products: AOKCALC; Extra-Sensory Perception (ESP); Extra-Sensory Perception.2 (ESP.2); Financial Reporting System (FRS); Personal Calculator

Advent Online Knowledge, Inc. was a Schaumburg, Illinois-based producer of software for Prime Computer minicomputers.

== Products ==
- AOKCALC - spreadsheet program
- Extra-Sensory Perception (ESP) - enabled a system administrator to monitor the activities of a selected terminal user or scan the activities of all terminal users on a system
- Extra-Sensory Perception.2 (ESP.2) - enabled a system administrator to capture all prelogon activities of selected dial-up and direct-connect lines in a file
- Financial Reporting System (FRS)
- Personal Calculator - a visual calculator
