= Convergent Technologies =

Former American computer company

Convergent Technologies, Inc.
- Industry: Computer hardware
- Founded: 1979
- Founders: Allen Michels; Bob Garrow; Kal Hubler; Ben Wegbreit
- Fate: Purchased by Unisys in 1988
- Headquarters: Santa Clara, California, U.S.
- Products: Multi-processor computer Work stations Personal computers
- Number of employees: 1300 (1984)
- Website: https://www.unisys.com

Convergent Technologies, Inc., was an American computer company formed by a small group of people who left Intel Corporation and Xerox PARC in 1979. Among the founders were CEO Allen Michels, VP Engineering Bob Garrow, head of marketing Kal Hubler, and operating system architect Ben Wegbreit. Convergent was primarily an OEM vendor with their computers resold by other manufacturers such as ADP, AT&T, Burroughs/Unisys, Four-Phase Systems, Gould Electronics, Mohawk Data Sciences, NCR, and Prime Computer. The company was purchased by Unisys in 1988.

== History ==
The Distributed Systems division was responsible for the IWS, AWS, and NGEN computers. These were the first fully concurrent, networked office workstations, built on the latest version of Intel's 80x86 family of microprocessors. They featured a distributed, message-based operating system CTOS, originally released before the IBM PC and MS-DOS existed, more than half a decade before stand-alone personal computers evolved into networked workstations with multi-process operating systems such as OS/2.

In 1982, Convergent formed the Data Systems division to focus on a multi-processor computer known as the MegaFrame, "the first system upgradable from super-minicomputer to mainframe". The division was headed by Ben Wegbreit and also responsible for the MiniFrame. Steve Blank, in charge of division marketing, went on to found several Silicon Valley startups, including E.piphany, and as of 2012 lectures on technology startups at Stanford University and elsewhere; Jon Huie was in charge of Software; Richard Lowenthal was in charge of Hardware.

Convergent also formed the Advanced Information Products division, with Matt Sanders taking lead of the new division. He was tasked with developing a computer for the low-end market (price target $499). The "Ultra" team was assembled and their pioneering mobile computing product, the WorkSlate, released in November 1983.

The Special Projects division was responsible for the AT&T products.

Former Hewlett-Packard executive Paul C. Ely Jr. took over as CEO in January 1985. That year UnixWorld reported that Convergent was the "only supermicro supplier that has succeeded in moving its product through large-volume OEM channels", unlike competitors like Fortune Systems. The company giving equity stakes and manufacturing licenses to OEMs like Burroughs Corporation had encouraged such relationships. Its prices were so low as to be sometimes unprofitable, the magazine said.

Michels, Sanders, Wegbreit, and another executive left in October 1985 to form The Dana Group. Shortly after, Convergent purchased 40% of Baron Data Systems for $14.6 million. Then purchased the remainder of Baron in May 1987, for $33 million.

Convergent reached an agreement to acquire 3Com in March 1986, but the merger was called off at the last moment.

Unisys bought Convergent Technologies in 1988, after which Convergent Technologies became Unisys Network Computing Group (NCG).

== Products ==
=== IWS ===
Introduced in 1980, Convergent's first product was the IWS (Integrated Workstation) based on a 5 MHz Intel 8086 microprocessor, with optional Intel 8087 math coprocessor. The WS-110 integrated the processor, memory I/O, and video display control boards along with two Multibus slots into a unique "lectern" situated next to the monitor and integrated into a common base. The WS-120 placed these boards along with five Multibus slots in a floor-standing enclosure. Floor-standing mass storage units would also be integrated into a system. The video hardware supported "soft fonts" allowing the character set to be changed in RAM rather than a fixed character set in ROM.

Burroughs sold the IWS as the B22, NCR sold it as the WorkSaver 100, and Savin released the Information Station 2000.

=== AWS ===
Introduced in November 1981, the next product was a cost-reduced desktop version called the AWS (Application Workstation) utilizing an Intel 8275 CRT controller instead of the custom video board used in the IWS. The IWS and AWS were compatible and ran in an RS-422 clustered environment under the proprietary Convergent Technologies Operating System (CTOS). In December 1982, Convergent announced the AWS Turbo Color Graphics Workstation using the NEC 7220 graphics controller with 128 KB display memory.

The AWS was sold by Burroughs as the B21, by Bull as the Corail B4000, by Prime Computer as the Prime Producer 100 (a word processing workstation), by NCR as the WorkSaver 200, and by Savin as the Information Station 1000.

=== MegaFrame ===
Available in August 1983, the MegaFrame (S/1280) consisted of up to eight 10 MHz Motorola 68010-based "Application Processors" running UNIX System III-derived CTIX talking to 8 MHz Intel 80186-based I/O processor boards each running their own scaled-down versions of CTOS: File Processor ("fpCTOS"), Cluster Processor ("cpCTOS"), Terminal Processor ("tpCTOS"), and SMD/Storage Processor ("spCTOS"). Each processor had its own RAM: 512 KB to 4 MB for the Application Processors, and 256 KB to 768 KB for the I/O processors. Up to 36 boards could be installed in a system: six in the base enclosure, with another six per expansion enclosure (five expansion enclosures maximum). Each File Processor could support up to four disks.

The MegaFrame was resold by Burroughs/Unisys as the XE550 running CENTIX and BTOS, and originally sold as the XE500 and XE520 without the Application Processors. Motorola/Four-Phase resold the MegaFrame as the System 6600.

=== NGEN ===
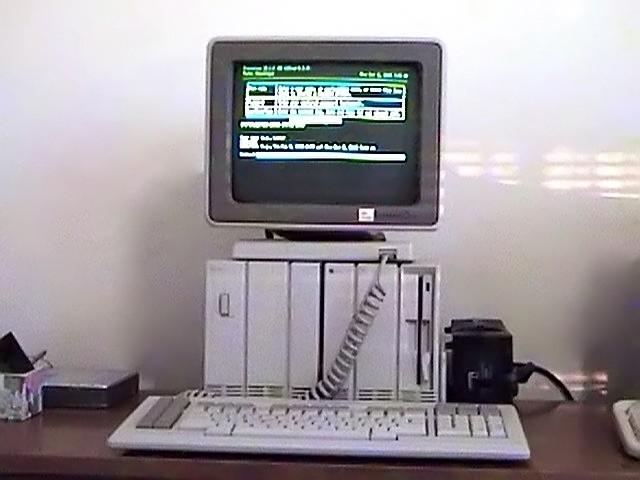
A Burroughs B25 computer, which is a rebadged NGEN

The AWS was replaced by the modular NGEN (Next Generation) workstation in late 1983, based initially on the Intel 80186 microprocessor. Convergent was Intel's first customer for the 80186, and the first NGEN was beta-tested using an early release of the new microprocessor. Convergent engineer Greg Walsh found and diagnosed a bug in the silicon, which Intel corrected in subsequent releases of the 80186. To Burroughs (and Unisys) users the NGEN was known as the B25 and to Prime Computer users as the Prime Producer 200. Bull sold the NGEN as the Questar 400, and NCR sold it as the WorkSaver 300. The NGEN was also sold with an MS-DOS version running on top of CTOS. It was sold as the M1000 by McDonnell Douglas Computer Systems Company (previously known as Microdata Corporation) who included a copy of their Pick-based Reality relational database which ran on MS-DOS. Datapoint released the NGEN as the Vista-PC running MS-DOS. Mohawk Data Sciences released the NGEN-based MDS HERO, and Telenorma/Bosch released the Isy. Other OEMs were the Gould Power Station and A. B. Dick Knowledge Worker.

Later models - the NGEN Series 286 (Burroughs B28), 386 (Burroughs B38), and 386i (Burroughs B39) - kept pace with Intel CPU development through the Intel 80286 and Intel 80386. CTOS was reissued as a protected-mode (large address space) operating system with virtual memory. (A successor to the NGEN called the SuperGen and based on the Intel 80486 was introduced in 1993 by Unisys, approximately 5 years after it had acquired Convergent Technologies.)

=== WorkSlate ===
Released in November 1983, the WorkSlate, an early tablet-style personal computer system, was designed and marketed by Convergent, with the industrial design done by Mike Nuttall. It was 1" thick and the size of a sheet of paper. Its primary user interface was a spreadsheet. The WorkSlate utilized a mini-cassette for voice- and data-recording and for loading a range of pre-packaged add-on applications called TaskWare to handle jobs such as the management of personal expenses, calendars, etc. At that time there was no facility to download such "apps" over the Internet, so they were available only on the mini-cassettes. The WorkSlate was developed in a highly compressed twelve-month development cycle which resulted in inadequate testing and a sub-optimal product which sold poorly. It was discontinued in the summer of 1984.

=== MiniFrame ===
Convergent introduced the Motorola 68010-based MiniFrame in May 1984 running CTIX. The MiniFrame came with 512 KB on the motherboard and could be extended with up to four stackable expansion boards (Ethernet, eight RS-232 ports, 512 KB memory boards), with a max of 2 MB RAM using three memory boards. The MiniFrame was used as the basis to develop the AT&T UNIX PC.

NCR and Burroughs were two resellers of the MiniFrame. Gould sold the MiniFrame as the Powerstation 2000 running UTX/2000. Motorola resold the MiniFrame as the System 6300 under the Four-Phase Systems Series 6000. Motorola/Four-Phase pioneered development of international character support for Unix platforms for their EMEA business using the CTOS/CTIX equipment.

=== AT&T UNIX PC ===
Convergent developed the first Motorola 68010 OEM UNIX product for AT&T, the AT&T UNIX PC, released in March 1985. The UNIX PC integrated a number features (Stream-based I/O, Multinational Language Support) to the Intel AT&T UNIX base (SVR3.2). Convergent also offered this machine directly as the S/50.

=== AT&T Personal Terminal 510 ===
Convergent developed the integrated voice/data Personal Terminal 510A (analog) and 510D (digital) for AT&T, introduced in March 1985. The 510A was for use with POTS lines, and the 510D for use with the AT&T System 75/85 PBX. The terminals featured a unique gel-based 9" touch screen providing a soft, cushiony feel.

=== MightyFrame ===
Released in 1986, Convergent used the Motorola 68020 and 68040 in their VME-based MightyFrame systems (S/80, S/120, S/221, S/222, S/280, S/320, S/480, S/640), all running CTIX.

=== Server PC ===
The 20-MHz 386-based Server PC running CTIX/386 (SVR3) was released in 1987. Merge 386 allowed Unix and DOS applications to run simultaneously, allowing the machine to function as both a PC server and 32-user Unix machine.
