= Families USA =

American nonprofit organization

- Type: Families USA Foundation is a nonprofit, nonpartisan, 501(c)3 organization
- Founded: 1981
- Headquarters: Washington D.C.
- Key people: Frederick Isasi (Executive Director)
- Revenue: 11,084,573 United States dollar (2011)
- Total assets: 50,495,441 United States dollar (2011)
- Website: familiesusa.org

Families USA is a United States nonprofit, nonpartisan consumer health advocacy and policy organization.

== History ==
Philippe Villers and his wife Kate Villers co-founded Families USA in 1981. Ron Pollack was also a co-founder and became executive director of the organization, a role he filled until 2017.

Families USA's advocacy in Washington, D.C., has influenced health care legislation and policy, including the Inflation Reduction Act of 2022, federal and state legislation in response to the COVID-19 pandemic, the Affordable Care Act (ACA), defending against efforts to repeal the Affordable Care Act, and the Children’s Health Insurance Program (CHIP).

President Barack Obama acknowledged Families USA's advocacy for the enactment and implementation of the ACA. On a printed copy of the ACA displayed in Families USA’s office, Obama wrote, “To Ron and Families USA – You made this happen!”

In 2017, Frederick Isasi was appointed Executive Director of Families USA. He succeeded Ron Pollack, who had led the organization for almost 35 years. Isasi has testified before Congress on issues including health care costs, payment and delivery reform, and healthcare coverage.

== Activities ==
The New York Times has described Families USA as a "nonpartisan consumer advocacy group". The organization advocates for public policy and research. It has been involved in state-by-state campaigns to address the Medicaid coverage gap among low-income Americans, supporting legislative strategies and producing analysis documenting the benefits of extending health coverage.

The organization has organized discussions on healthcare issues among stakeholder organizations, including insurers, hospitals, physicians, pharmaceutical companies, businesses, labor, and consumers. One such dialogue led to the creation of the Campaign for Children’s Health Care (CHIP), which advocated for extension of CHIP. Another set of discussions focused on extending health coverage to the uninsured. A later dialogue developed proposals for increased quality care at lower costs.

Families USA's organization includes the National Center for Coverage Innovation (NCCI) which advocates for measures to expand access to healthcare coverage.

== See also ==
- List of healthcare reform advocacy groups in the United States
- Physicians for a National Health Program
