= Allen Michels =

American businessman

- Occupation: Business executive
- Known for: Co-founder Convergent Technologies, The Dana Group

Allen Michels (1941-2024) was an American business executive and founder of Convergent Technologies and The Dana Group. Allen continued on in consulting roles through the 90s, and eventually founded a healthcare startup.

== Career ==
Michels held management positions at Digital Equipment Corporation and Intel before co-founding Convergent Technologies in 1979. Convergent was primarily an OEM vendor with their computers resold by other manufacturers. Michels served as the CEO until 1985 when he and other executives left to form The Dana Group (Dana Computer). The Dana Group would be renamed Ardent Computer in 1987 due to another company already having the name Dana Computer. Ardent built Titan graphics workstations.

Michels came out of retirement in 1993 to join Dean Snow as a founder of Macinstitute.

== Death ==
Michels died on June 2, 2024 at the age of 83 at a hospital near his home in Mahwah, New Jersey.
