= Central High School (Memphis, Tennessee) =

United States historic place picture

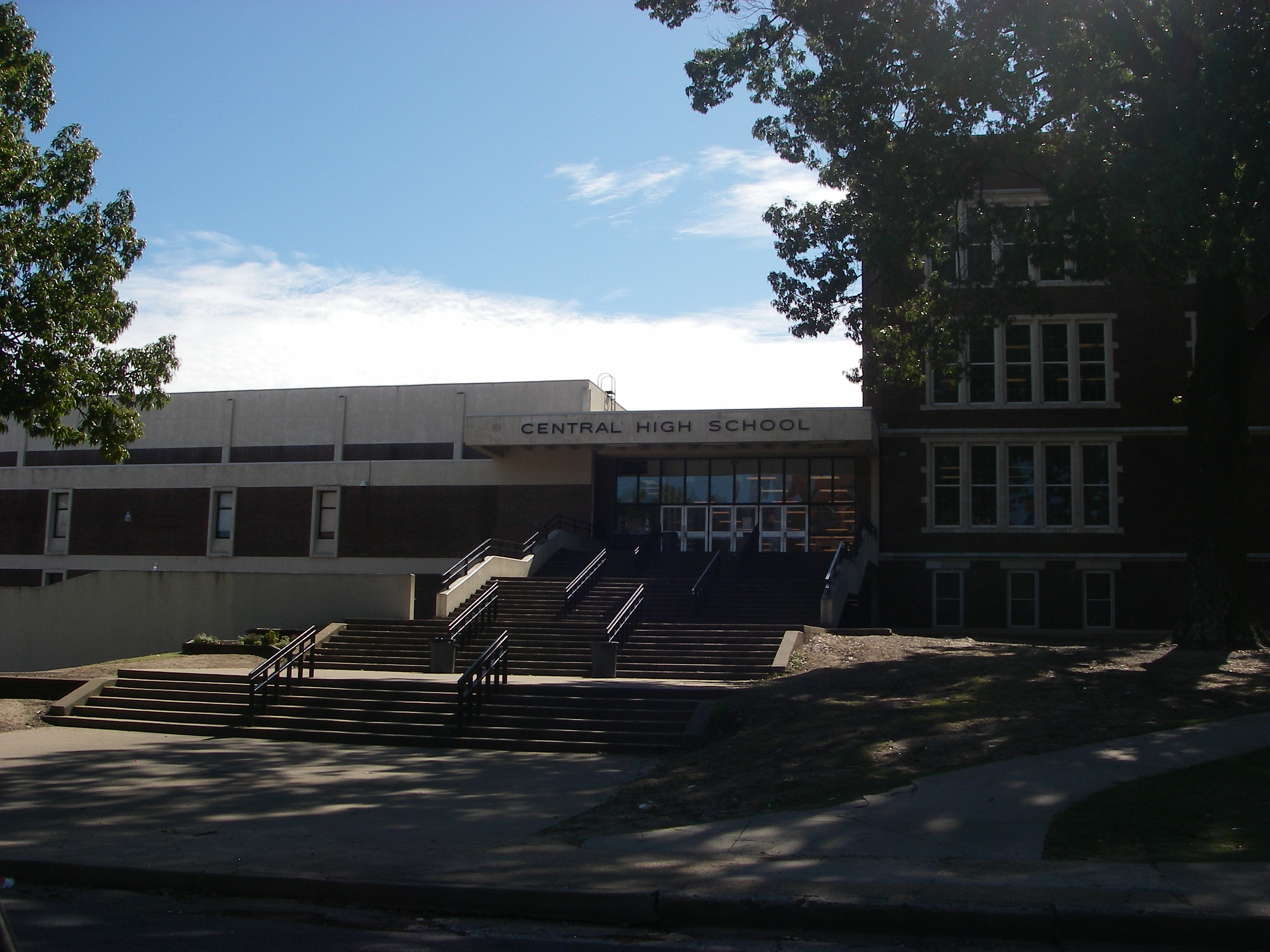
- Memphis Central High modern entry
- 306 South Bellevue Boulevard; Memphis, Tennessee 38104; United States

Information
- Type: Public
- Motto: Enhancing The Tradition of Excellence
- Established: 1909
- School district: Memphis-Shelby County Schools
- Principal: Amy Epps
- Teaching staff: 78.98 (FTE)
- Grades: 9–12
- Enrollment: 1,300 (2023–2024)
- Student to teacher ratio: 16.46
- Colors: Green and gold
- Fight song: Warrior Song/War Drum
- Mascot: Warrior
- Nickname: The High School
- Website: central-hs.scsk12.org

- Central High School
- U.S. National Register of Historic Places
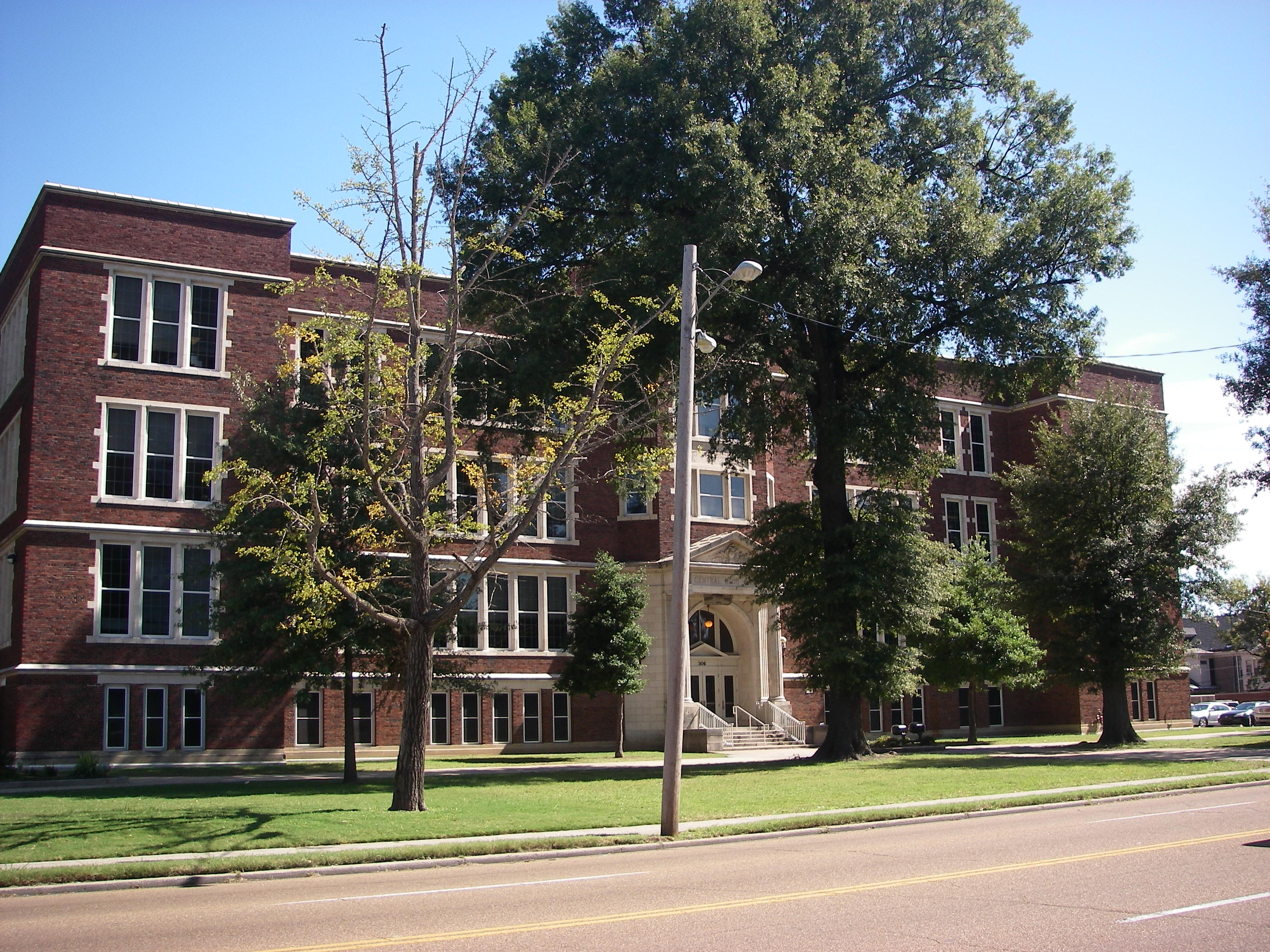
- Front of Central High

- Location within Tennessee Location within the United States
- Location: 306 S. Bellevue Blvd., Memphis, Tennessee
- Coordinates: 35°8′1″N 90°1′11″W
- Area: 6 acres (2.4 ha)
- Built: 1911
- Architect: B.C. Alsup
- Architectural style: Tudor Revival, Jacobethan Revival
- MPS: Public Schools of Memphis 1902-1915 TR
- NRHP reference No.: 82004041
- Added to NRHP: September 17, 1982

Central High School is a public high school (grades 9-12) in Memphis, Tennessee, United States. Founded in the early 1900s, it is popularly considered the first high school in Memphis. However, three high schools in Memphis were established before Central: Booker T. Washington in 1873 (with the same colors and mascot), Manassas in 1899, and Melrose in 1894.

Central is often called "THE" High School. It is a part of the Memphis-Shelby County School system where it is recognized as a school specializing in college preparatory programs. The principal is Amy Epps. Central's mascot is the Warrior (formerly the Thunderbird) and the school colors are green and gold. For recognition as the successor to Memphis High School, the first high school for whites in Memphis, Central High's football team, rather than having artwork denoting the "Warrior" mascot, simply has a capital "H", for THE High School

== History ==
Central High was built in 1911 by the Memphis Board of Education, when the current building was erected on Raleigh Avenue, now called Bellevue Blvd. It is in the Jacobean Revival architecture style, with corner pavilions on the west facade, and rusticated surrounds on the upper story windows. Though there have been additions, the school retains its architectural integrity. Central High's building was added to the National Register of Historic Places on September 17, 1982.

== Academics ==
Central High School offers a traditional program of academics as well as a College Preparatory Optional Program. Honors and Advanced Placement courses are offered.

In 2014, 405 students received diplomas. ACT composite scores for the 2014-2015 school year were 18.1 vs 19.8 for the state and 21.1 national.

== Extra-curricular activities ==
Central High School has clubs in foreign language, volunteer service, and honor societies. Central's jazz band placed first in the 2025 Essentially Ellington High School Jazz Band Competition in New York City, winning additional awards for trumpet, trombone, and rhythm sections.

=== Sports ===
Central High has numerous varsity sports teams, including baseball/softball, basketball, swimming, golf, football, soccer, volleyball, cross country/track, tennis, and wrestling. Central's football and track teams play home at Crump Stadium.

== Notable alumni ==
- William F. Barnes - football coach at UCLA
- John S. Bull - CHS '52, NASA Astronaut Group 5 selected in 1966.
- Charles W. Burson - CHS '62; legal counsel and chief of staff to Vice-President Al Gore
- Alex Chilton - musician of the Box Tops – “The Letter”; would have been CHS '69, but dropped out when The Letter became a hit
- John Farris - CHS ’55; author “Harrison High”, a fictional account of Central High
- Avron Fogelman - Memphis businessman
- Key Glock - CHS '15; music artist and rapper signed to Paper Route Empire
- Bette Greene - CHS ’52; author “Summer of My German Soldier”
- Natalie Jackson - CHS '78; (a.k.a. Kudisan Kai) background vocalist for Elton John, Natalie Cole, and others
- Lester Hudson - professional basketball player
- George Barnes - alias Machine Gun Kelly
- William G. Leftwich, Jr. - Marine killed in Vietnam
- Terry Manning - music producer, photographer
- William Poduska - CHS '55; electrical engineer, businessman, and professor
- Allen Reynolds - music producer
- William Sanderson - CHS ’62; "Larry" on the Newhart show
- Pooh Shiesty - CHS '18; rapper and music artist
- Edward L. Stanton III - United States Attorney & federal judicial nominee
- Tyler Stone (born 1991) - basketball player in the Israeli Basketball Premier League
- Art Tait - American football player in the National Football League (NFL)
- Peter Taylor - short-story writer and novelist
- Margaret Valiant - musician, folklorist, ethnomusicologist and activist
- Jon Wells - CHS '76; alias "Thunder Paws", former drummer for Black Oak Arkansas (recorded on Ready As Hell)
- Kemmons Wilson - founder of Holiday Inn
