= Bull Questar =

Computer terminal series by Groupe Bull

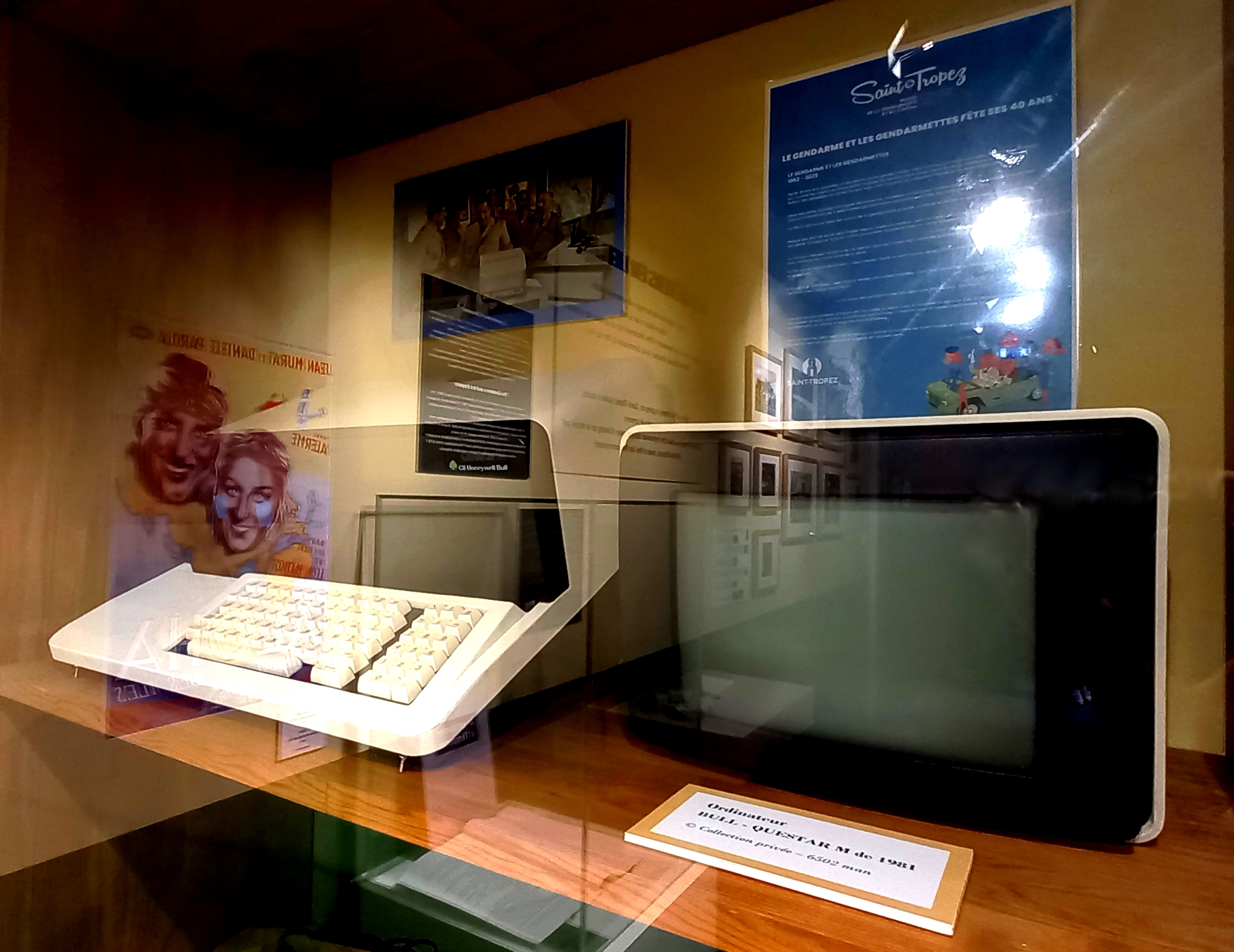
Bull Questar M from 1981, exhibited at musée de la Gendarmerie et du Cinéma de Saint-Tropez, France.

In information technology, Questar computer terminals are a line of largely 3270-compatible text-only dumb terminals manufactured by Groupe Bull and widely used in France and some other markets. The terminals combine standard 3270 emulation with a number of Questar-specific features. The terminals have been most successful with users who already operate compatible Bull mainframe systems, and have achieved far less market penetration as plug-compatible replacements for IBM 3270 terminals.

The Bull Questar 400 was a licensed version of the Convergent Technologies NGEN.

However there was Bull Questar M, in fact Micral series 80. Z80 based microcomputer.
