= Burroughs B20 =

Microcomputer family

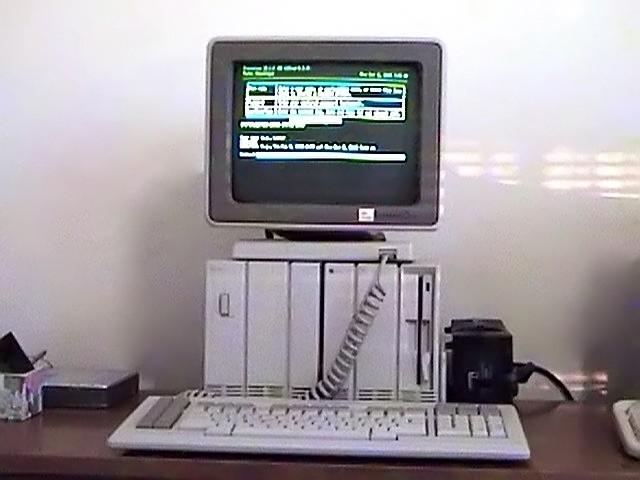
- A Burroughs B25 computer running BTOS
- Developer: Convergent Technologies
- Type: 16-bit professional
- Released: May 1982; 44 years ago
- Operating system: BTOS
- CPU: Intel 8086
- Memory: 640K
- Display: CRT

The B20 is a line of microcomputers from Burroughs Corporation. The systems, introduced in May 1982, consist of two models: the B21 and the B22. The B21 models are rebadged Convergent Technologies AWS workstations incorporating an Intel 8086 CPU. The B22 models are rebadged IWS workstations. They run the BTOS operating system, which is a version of Convergent's CTOS, as well as CP/M and MS-DOS.

Systems support up to 640 KB of RAM. The B22 included a mass storage unit with a capacity of up to 60 MB.

The Burroughs B25, a rebadged Convergent NGEN system with an Intel 80186 CPU, was introduced in 1983. The B26 was introduced in 1984, and a B28 system followed in 1985 based on the Intel 80286 CPU.

There is also an 80186-based B27 which used an "F-bus" rather than the "X-bus" used on the B25/B26/B28.

A cluster only (no storage) 80186-based B24 was later released and commonly used by bank tellers.
