= Prime Computer =

1972–1998 American producer of minicomputers

Prime Computer, Inc.
- Type: Public
- Founded: 1972; 54 years ago
- Defunct: 1998
- Fate: Acquired by Parametric Technology Corporation

Prime Computer, Inc. was a Natick, Massachusetts-based producer of minicomputers from 1972 until 1992. With the advent of PCs and the decline of the minicomputer industry, Prime was forced out of the market in the early 1990s, and by the end of 2010 the trademarks for both PRIME and PRIMOS no longer existed.

The alternative spellings "PR1ME" and "PR1MOS" were used as brand names or logos by the company.

== Founders ==
The company was started by seven founders, some of whom worked on the Multics project at MIT.

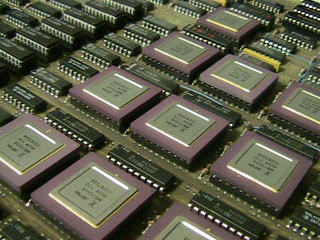
Part of the CPU board of a Prime minicomputer

- Robert Baron (president)
- Sidney Halligan (VP Sales)
- James Campbell (Director of Marketing)
- Joseph Cashen (VP Hardware Engineering)
- Robert Berkowitz (VP Manufacturing)
- William Poduska (VP Software Engineering)
- John Carter (Director of Human Resources)

The company started with the motto "Software First".

Poduska left in 1981, to start Apollo Computer. His successor was 27-year IBM executive Joe M. Henson, although Prime's president, Kenneth G. Fisher, had briefly been the interim top executive.

== Minicomputer products ==
The initial offerings by Prime were clones of Honeywell's DDP 316 and 516 minicomputers. Main competitors were Digital Equipment Corporation, Data General and Hewlett-Packard. As of June 1975 time-sharing was Prime's largest end-user market, and 25% of revenue was from OEM. Overseas markets provided 42% of revenue in the first quarter of 1975.

- 1972: Prime 200

The first Prime system was similar to the 16-bit DDP 516. It ran an operating system called DOS, also referred to as PRIMOS 2 (not to be confused with MS-DOS, PC DOS, etc.).

- 1973: Prime 100

The Prime 100 was a stripped down version of the Prime 200 (no memory parity or floating point).

- 1974: Prime 300

The Prime 300 had a main store of 32 KB to 512 KB and from 6 MB of Pertec disk storage. It ran DOSVM operating system, also referred to as PRIMOS 3, but still used earlier DOS for booting. One of the first minicomputers with microcode-supported virtual memory capability. The virtual memory was simpler than used in later systems. Addresses were 16 bits, with each of up to 32 time-sharing (time slice) users, receiving a virtual 64 K-word address space. It had S-mode and R-mode instructions.

An example of the Prime 300 was installed in the mathematics department of the University of Aston in Birmingham, UK and at the Medical University of Hannover, Germany.

- 1976: Prime 400

The Prime 400 ran at 0.5 MIPS, had a main store of up to 8 MB and 160 MB of disc storage. The name PRIMOS was now used for the operating system, and the P400 ran PRIMOS 4. It ran a V-mode instruction set, along with the S-mode and R-mode instructions. It had a segmented virtual memory architecture, somewhat similar to Multics.

- 1979: Prime 450, 550, 650, 750—the beginning of the 50 series nomenclature

The Prime 550 was an upgrade in performance over the Prime 400. It ran at 0.7 MIPS, had up 2 MB of memory and 500 MB of disc storage and a 9-track tape unit.

The Prime 750 was a major upgrade. It ran at 1.0 MIPS, had 2–8 MB of memory and 1200 MB of disc storage and a 9-track tape unit. This was very competitive with a similarly priced DEC VAX-11/780 and was one of the first 32-bit superminicomputers. Prime 750 systems were installed at Rensselaer Polytechnic Institute (RPI), Rutherford Appleton Laboratory (RAL), University of Paisley, Leeds University, Scripps Institution of Oceanography (SIO), University of Rhode Island, University of Manchester Institute of Science and Technology (UMIST), the CADCentre in Cambridge, and Southeastern University in Washington, DC, Teesside University.

PRIMENET and a local area networking software product named RINGNET were announced.

- 1980: Prime 150 and 250
- 1981: Prime 850 (dual CPU machine)

Prime also marketed MEDUSA CAD software.

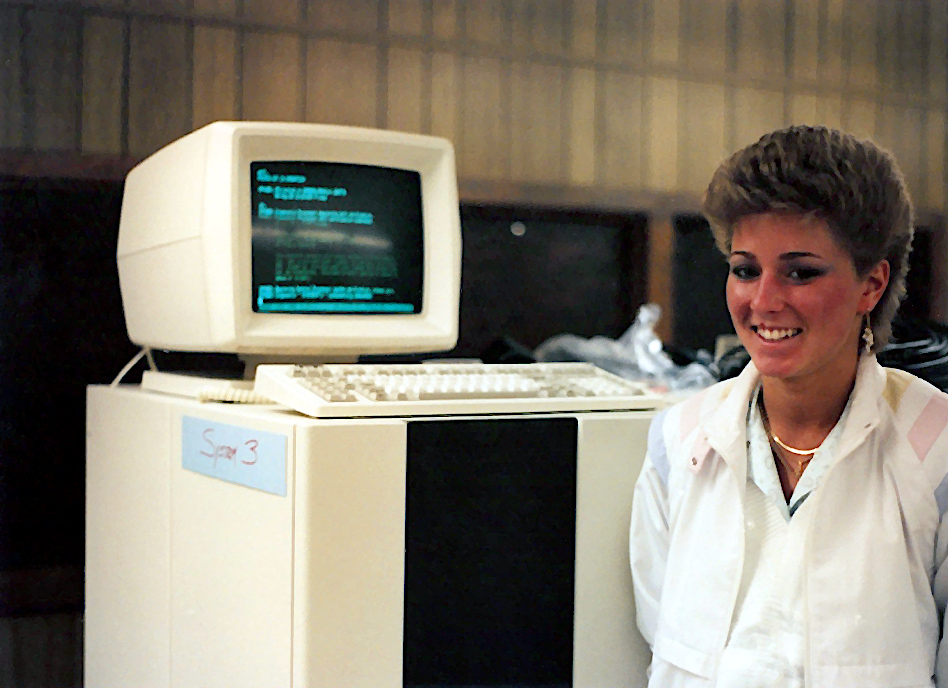
A Prime 9950 computer system with CRT console in Kean University computer room

- 1982: Prime 2250 also known internally as "Rabbit"
- 1983: Prime 9950
- 1984: Prime 2550, 9650, 9750
- 1985: Prime 9955, 9655, 2655

The 9955 ran at 4.0 MIPS, had 8–16 MB of memory and 2.7 GB of disc storage and a 9-track tape unit.
Five Prime 9955 computers (uk.ac.salford.sysa to .syse, connected to JANET) were installed at the University of Salford (along with other systems such as the 2250, 2550, and 750); a Prime 9955 was installed at UMIST and a Prime 9655 at Nottingham University.

- 1986: Prime 2350, 2450, 9755, and 9955-II
- 1987: Prime 2455, 2755, 6350, and 6550
- 1989: Prime 2850, 4050, 6450, and 6650
- 1990: Prime 2950, 4150, and 6150

By 1987, Prime Computer had introduced an alternative line of Intel 80386-based computers, the EXL-316 series, running the Unix operating system. A "new line of Unix-based EXL-7000 computers" was announced in late 1990.

The company was successful in the 1970s and 1980s, peaking in 1988 at number 334 of the Fortune 500. In 1985, the company was the sixth largest in the minicomputer sector, with estimated revenues of US $564 million Much of this was based on the U.S. banking industry where the Prime Info database was widely accepted.

As of later 1989, Surrey University had the largest Prime site in Europe, having multiple copies of virtually every 50 series machine (mostly running Primos 20.x, but some still running 19.x).

== CAD/CAM Business ==
Prime was heavily involved with Ford’s internal computer-aided design (CAD) product, Product Design Graphics System (PDGS). Design engineers used PDGS for auto body design, and finite element analysis using NASTRAN. It used a vectorscope from Lundy for a display. At one time in the 1980s, PDGS was the world's largest integrated CAD system, spanning the US, Japan (Mazda was Ford's subsidiary/partner), (Cologne) Germany, (Dunton) England, and (Geelong) Australia. The creators of PDGS, located in building #3 of Ford's Dearborn design headquarters, began working on the concept of parametrically driven geometry, which led to a PRIMEDesign system.

The company also acquired marketing and development rights to the MEDUSA CAD system, initially developed in England by Cambridge Interactive Systems (CIS), and having experience in the domain, the company explored transitioning to a CAD company. In 1982, Prime built a development team around the MEDUSA software and subsequently released several enhanced versions of the CAD/CAM system, branded as Prime MEDUSA. Enhancements included support of SunOS (also supported by CIS MEDUSA), a shaded viewer (based on Movie.BYU), and additional 3d visualization. Prime embarked on a project headed by Vladimir Geisberg to build a CAD-CAM system of its own called PRIMEDesign. This product was to compete with the industry leader at that time, CADDS4 from Computervision. RISC processors from MIPS Technologies and graphics processors from Silicon Graphics comprised the hardware platform for PRIMEDesign in the form of Prime's PCXL 5500 workstation, itself largely based on SGI's first IRIS 4D workstation product. During this period, in 1985, Sam Geisberg left Computervision to found Parametric Technology Corporation and produce a parameter driven CAD system called ProEngineer. Computervision acquired Cambridge Interactive Systems in 1983, and Prime independently developed their version of MEDUSA.

Prime subsequently purchased Computervision, and Vladimir Geisberg, then VP for CAD, tried to merge back together the Prime and Computervision versions of the Medusa CAD system, and launch Prime Design. As time passed, it became clear that Prime Design, while leading edge, in theory, was unsuitable for real engineering design work, and Prime Design was ended.

== Decline and end ==
By the late eighties, the company was having problems retaining customers who were moving to lower-cost systems, as minicomputers entered their decline to obsolescence. Prime failed to keep up with customers' increasing need for raw computing power. By the end, not a single Prime computer was subject to COCOM export controls, as they were insufficiently powerful for the US Government to fear their falling into the hands of hostile powers.

In 1988, financier Bennett S. LeBow attempted a hostile takeover of Prime, leveraging his much smaller MAI Basic Four company. To stave off LeBow, Prime management organized a $1.3 billion "white knight" leveraged buyout by J.H. Whitney & Company. Various problems dogged this project, the holding company organized by Whitney went bankrupt, and the resulting severe financial distress made it much harder for Prime to deal with the accelerating downturn in its core business.

Prime's 1991 revenues of $1.2 billion were 25% lower than their 1988 revenues of $1.6 billion. Its computer sales were down by more than half ($377 million in 1989, $170 million in 1991), and by 1992 no new Prime Computers were being sold, portending a decline in its lucrative business of servicing computers made by Prime (and other manufacturers), a significant contributor to its already-declining revenues. A planned 1989 layoff of 1,200 employees became much more: over 6,000, thus Prime's workforce dropped by over half, from 12,386 employees in 1988 to 5,900 by the end of 1991.

After the computer design and manufacturing portions of the company were shut down, the only viable business that remained was the Computervision subsidiary, an early pioneer in CAD/CAM, which was acquired in a hostile takeover 1988. Prime was renamed Computervision, which in 1992 sold the declining remnants of its Prime Information subsidiary to VMark Software Inc.

Computervision was subsequently successfully acquired by Parametric Technology Corporation in 1998, a company founded in 1985 by a former Prime employee.

== Operating system ==
The company operating system, PRIMOS was originally written mostly in the Fortran IV programming language with some assembler. Subsequently, the PL/P (a subset of PL/I developed by Prime) and Modula-2 languages were used in the Kernel. A number of new PRIMOS utilities were written in SP/L which was similar to PL/P.

The developers of VisiCalc, the first spreadsheet computer program, that ran on Apple II and other personal computers, wrote the tools (editor, assembler, linker) they used to write VisiCalc on a Prime minicomputer using Prime's version of PL/I.

== Phantom, CPL and ED ==
"Phantoms" were a form of unattended background processes that immediately began to run in the background when initiated by the PHANTOM command. "Conventional" batch jobs were initiated via the JOB command, including the ability to schedule them for a particular time.

CPL, the PRIMOS Command Processing Language was the shell scripting language.

The PRIMOS text editor ed was a line editor. It could record a command sequence and replay it on different files. Emacs, a full screen editor, was also available.

== Prime 300 specification ==
- A microprogrammed 16-bit central processor with floating point hardware, error detection and system integrity checking features.
- 128 KB, 600 nanosecond access MOS main memory.
- 6 MB cartridge disk. 165 cps character printer.
- System software including a disk operating system and FORTRAN, BASIC and assembler for assembly language.
- Support for up to 31 users for a total purchase price of about US$165,000.

== Specialised software ==
=== General business ===
==== Advent Online Knowledge ====
Advent Online Knowledge, Inc. was a Schaumburg, Illinois-based producer of software for Prime computers.

==== Marc Software ====
Marc Software International, Inc. of Palo Alto, California produced WordMARC word processing software for Prime computers.

==== Computer Techniques (Queo) ====
While Prime's PRIMOS operating system supported one or more compilers/interpreters for COBOL, FORTRAN, BASIC, RPG and 2 assemblers, Queo was a step up: a procedural language more compact than COBOL, and with additional capabilities.

It was offered by Computer Techniques, Inc. of Olyphant, Pa. Queo later was reimplemented for PCs.

==== Office Automation System ====
Prime acquired the OAS application from its developer, ACS America Inc., a now-defunct New York City software house.

It competed in the UK DTI Office Automation Pilot, but did not win.

OAS included electronic mail and word processing. Electronic mail use was initially restricted to a single minicomputer. Much later, Prime released email that worked with multiple Prime computers in a network, and a synchronised global directory system. Word processing was available either on dumb terminals like the PT25, PT45 and PST100, or on the partially intelligent PT65 terminal. The PT65 had to download the word processing software from the host minicomputer whenever the terminal was turned on. The terminal allowed the user to work on one page at a time, which was periodically saved to the minicomputer. This "intelligent workstation" concept for word processing was similar to the functions of popular systems from rival Wang Laboratories. Prime's intelligent workstation for word processing was faster because it used RS232C cabling runs instead of the coaxial links that Wang's systems used. Nonetheless, the word processing was not of the highest quality, and the PT65 was subject to software errors that scrambled the documents being worked on.

OAS also had a bilingual language lookup feature, sometimes marketed as machine translation.

Recognising the drawbacks of the downloadable WP workstation, Prime formed an agreement with Convergent Technologies for their AWS which Prime named the "Prime Producer 100" (launched in mid 1983) and later for Convergent's modular NGEN, clip together system, the "Prime Producer 200" (launched in 1984), each of which had far superior WP to the initial Prime offering, and were document-based.

In the UK, Prime had a very active OAS User Group whose suggestions were acted upon in new product development. UK Pioneers of the system included the London Docklands Development Corporation and Oxford Polytechnic, now Oxford Brookes University.

==== Prime Information ====
Both the Pick environment and Prime Information were based on the Generalized Information Retrieval Language System (GIRLS), developed by Richard Pick for the American Department of Defense.

Devcom, a Microdata reseller, wrote a Pick-style database system called INFORMATION in FORTRAN and assembler in 1979 to run on Prime Computer 50-series systems. INFO/BASIC, a variant of Dartmouth BASIC, was used for database applications. It was then sold to Prime Computer and renamed Prime INFORMATION.

Unlike the Pick operating system, a complete operating system, Prime Information was not an operating system, but a 4GL system that ran from the Prime PRIMOS operating system.

Prime Information was a re-implementation which deliberately left out some features and added others. Prime Information allowed rapid 4GL or 4GL-like development of applications around relational or quasi-relational database structures. After a series of evolutions and acquisitions Prime Information is now an obsolete part of the Rocket U2 software suite.

==== Prime Information Connection ====
In c. 1984, Prime developed a system to conflict with OAS and confuse the market. Prime Information Connection added word processing to Prime Information, giving the company two office oriented suites to offer in a marketplace dominated by Wang Laboratories.

=== CAD/CAM ===
Prime originally entered the CAD industry through Ford. At the time, Ford was using Control Data Corporation (CDC) stand-alone computers. Data was shared via reel tape and stored in "Data Collector" rooms at each facility. Ford began looking for a small computer that had all the advantages of the CDC computers, but could also connect to a network.

Prime’s 2250 ("Rabbit") offered the combination Ford was looking for in a package smaller than the original CDCs. In addition, the PRIMOS operating system would run unaltered across all Prime platforms; from the 2250 up to 750 (what would be considered today as a server). As a result, the Data Collector (rooms) would contain several 750 class machines, each with rows of CDC 300 or 600 MB drives. Primenet (Token Ring) network connected all CAD stations in a building with its Data Collector.

Ford pushed PDGS out to its suppliers and engineering contractors throughout the northern Midwest.

Prime gained expertise over the years with its collaboration with Ford and continued to expand into the CAD market with its Medusa product. With the acquisition of ComputerVision, Prime appeared to be a formidable force in the CAD/CAM industry.

Prime Medusa versions 5 and CV Medusa 7 were merged/recombined into a product that was called Medusa version 12. Prime also picked up Calma CAD systems from GE.

== Electronic messaging ==
Electronic messaging was developed on relay.prime.com, which was the hub that relayed global electronic mail for Prime Computer. The software used on this computer system, PDN Mail, developed by Robert Ullmann, was designed to use the encoding header field that was later explained in a Request for Comments. PDN Mail was also used by Microsoft Corporation until MIME was introduced.

Before MIME existed, PDN Mail was able to perform the same functions and was used to send software updates as well as all sorts of attachments between systems. In August 1993, Robert Ullmann, David Robinson and Al Costanzo wrote RFC 1505. This RFC, documented the Encoding Header Field for Internet Messages that PDN mail used and was published by the RFC editor, Jon Postel that same year.

== Marketing ==
A paperclip distributed by Prime Computer as promotional material.

A series of memorable advertisements created by Australian artist Rone Waugh in 1980 featured actors Tom Baker and Lalla Ward as their characters from the TV series Doctor Who. All four of these adverts have since been included on the DVD release of the 1979 serial Destiny of the Daleks in which both actors appear.

== See also ==
- PRIMOS
