= Convergent Technologies Operating System =

Operating system

Convergent Technologies Operating System (CTOS)
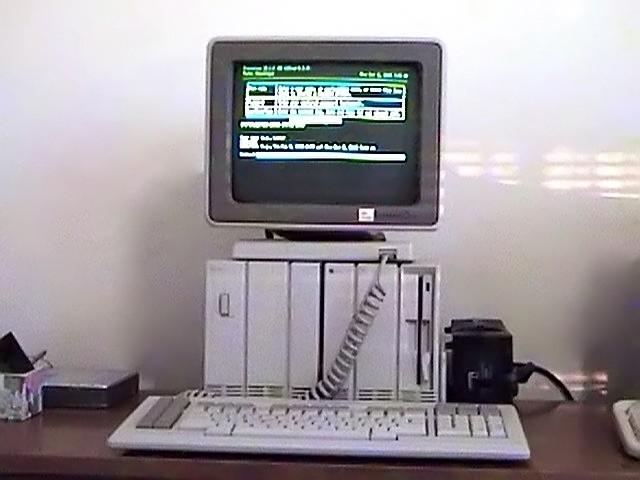
- A Burroughs B25 computer running CTOS
- Developer: Convergent Technologies
- Written in: PL/M
- Working state: Discontinued
- Initial release: 1980; 46 years ago
- Supported platforms: x86
- Kernel type: Microkernel
- License: Proprietary

The Convergent Technologies Operating System, also known variously as CTOS, BTOS and STARSYS, is a discontinued modular, message-passing, multiprocess-based operating system. It was sold by Convergent Technologies, and from 1988, when they acquired Convergent, by Unisys.

== Overview ==
CTOS had many innovative features for its time. It was a multi-process operating system like UNIX, but it implemented process concurrency via the message passing paradigm, as an alternative to the thread monitor locking paradigm used by most other multi-process computer operating systems. Message passing is the concurrency paradigm of most real-time operating systems used to reliably control physical machinery in a timely manner in resource-competitive environments, such as the early one used by NASA in the Apollo Lunar Module (LEM) which famously flew Armstrong and Aldrin to the surface of the moon, with only seconds of fuel left to spare, despite CPU overload. Message passing is also the control paradigm used between computers in networks and in multi-computer computation, such as in internet server farms. In CTOS, the same message-passing protocol was used to implement multiple processes within each workstation and to distribute system services (shared files, email servers, etc.) across the cluster of workstations. Thread monitor locking, on the other hand, is the internal concurrency paradigm of most mainframe, minicomputer, personal computer and personal device operating systems, and it is embedded in some concurrent programming languages such as Java.

System access in CTOS was controlled with a user password and volume or disk passwords. Each volume and directory were referenced with delimiters to identify them, and could be followed with a file name, depending on the operation, i.e. {Network Node}[VolumeName]<DirectoryName>FileName.

It was possible to custom-link the operating system to add or delete kernel features, but installation of modular services (system processes) occurred at boot time.

CTOS supported a transparent peer-to-peer network carried over serial RS-422 cables (daisy-chain topology) and in later versions carried over twisted pair (star topology) with RS-422 adapters using CTOS Cluster Hub-R12 designed by Paul Jackson Ph.D. of SumNet Pty Limited in Australia. Each workgroup (called a "cluster") was connected to a server (called a "master"). The workstations, potentially diskless, could be booted over the cluster network from the master, or they could be locally booted from an attached hard drive.

Inter-process communication (IPC) in CTOS is based on a "request" and "respond" messaging foundation that enhances Enterprise Application Integration among services for both internal and external environments. Thus CTOS was well known for its message-based Microkernel Architecture. Applications are added as services to the main server. Each client consumes the services via its own mailbox called an "exchange" using well-published message formats. The communication works on "request codes" that are owned by the service. The operating system maintains the exchanges, message queues, scheduling, control, message passing, etc., while the service manages the messages at its own exchange using "wait", "check", and "respond" system calls.

CTOS ran on Intel x86 computers, and could run concurrently with Windows NT on Unisys PC. As initially deployed on the Intel 8086 and Intel 80186 microprocessors, it was limited to an address space of up to 1 megabyte of RAM. Later on the Intel 80286 support for protected mode was added, breaking the 1 megabyte barrier common to PCs of that era. For the Intel 80386 virtual memory (paging) was added.

The system API was presented to both high-level languages and assembly language.

== Programs ==
The assembler was very advanced, with a Lisp-like pattern-matching macro facility unmatched by almost any other assembler before or since. There was an always-resident debugger.

Most of the system programs were written in PL/M, an ALGOL-like language from Intel which compiled directly to object code without a runtime library.

The word processor was one of the first screen-oriented editors with many high-powered features, such as multiple views of the same file, cut/copy/paste, unlimited undo/redo, no typing lost after a crash or power failure, user-selectable fonts, and much more.

The spreadsheet allowed blocks of cells to be protected from editing or other user input. The BTOS version allowed scripts to be written that included opening the spreadsheet for user input, then automatically printing graphs based on the input data.

The system shell was extensible, making it possible to define new commands. To get the parameters, the system would display the form which was to be filled out by the user. The input form had conventions for mandatory and optional input fields, which made it very easy to train new users.

== Usage ==
Convergent Technologies' first product was the IWS (Integrated Workstation) based on the Intel 8086 processor, which had CTOS as its operating system. This was a modular operating system with built-in local area networking. CTOS supported multiple processes or threads, and message-based interprocess communication.

Companies that licensed CTOS included Bull (STARSYS), and Burroughs (BTOS) who later merged with Sperry to become Unisys. Unisys was the single largest customer and acquired Convergent Technologies in 1988. At its peak, CTOS had over 800,000 users worldwide.

CTOS is no longer marketed to new customers. Former major customers included police forces, banks, airlines, Nationwide Insurance, U-Haul, the U.S. Postal Service, the Drug Enforcement Administration, the U.S. Army and the United States Coast Guard. The Coast Guard used the operating system from approximately 1984 until 2000. In Australia, CTOS/BTOS was used by the Trade Practices Commission, NSW Auditor-General's, CSIRO, Commonwealth Electoral Office, Western Australia Prisons Department and many commercial banks.

Some Convergent systems used the Intel 80186 processor, a processor seldom used by standard PCs.

Progress Software Corporation made a commercial database application for CTOS that was in 4GL. The United States Coast Guard used these databases for logistics administration for their vessels.

There was a port of CorelDRAW for CTOS running the Presentation Manager.
