= Melanie Welham =

British biochemist

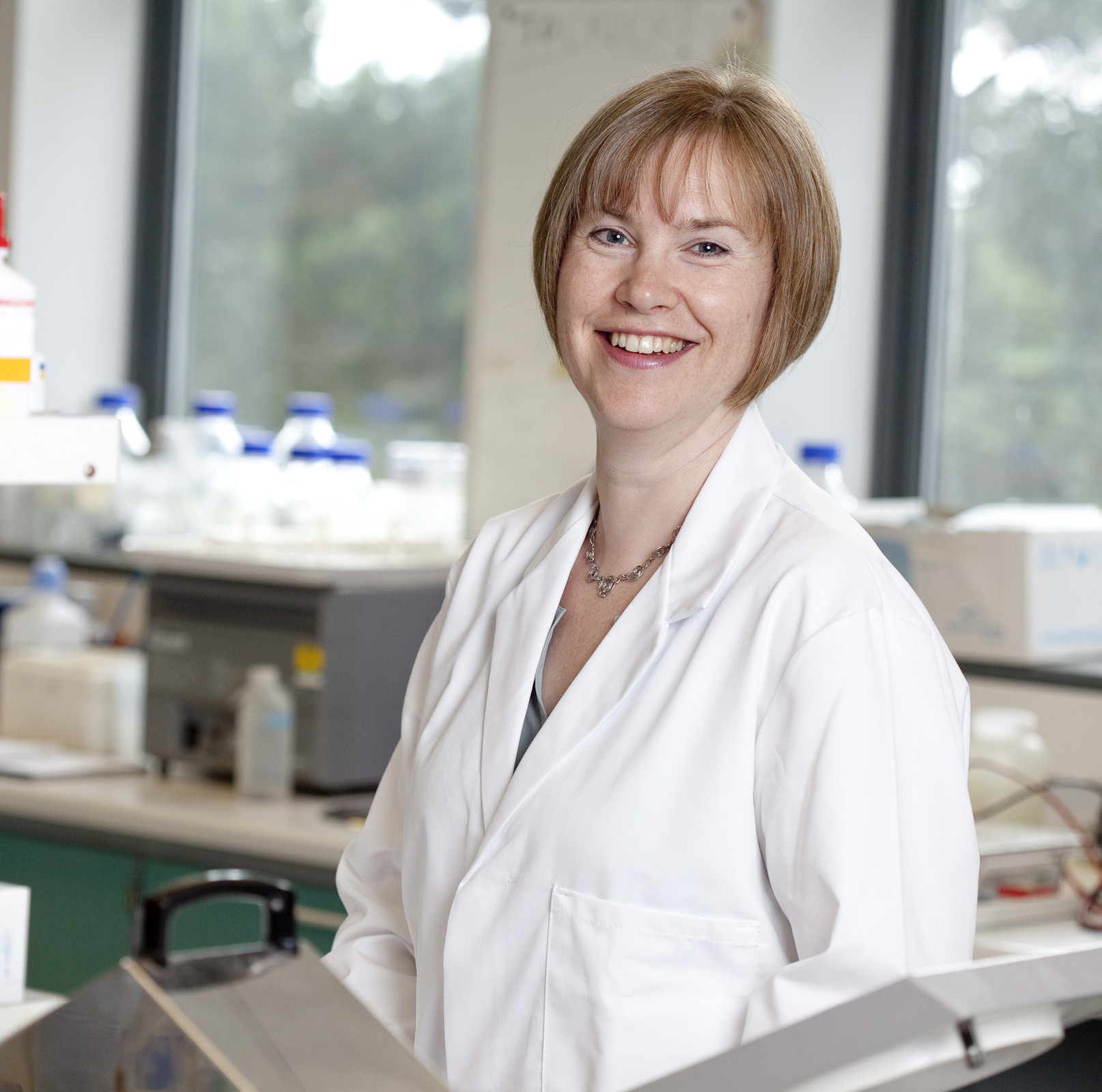
- Welham as BBSRC Chief Executive in 2018
- Born: Melanie Joanne Welham; 1964 (age 61–62)
- Education: Imperial College London; University College London
- Scientific career
- Workplaces: University of British Columbia; Biotechnology and Biological Sciences Research Council; University of Bath
- Thesis: Functional and genetic analyses of the V-"src" oncogene (1988)

Dame Melanie Joanne Welham DBE (born 1964) is a British biochemist who was Executive Chair of the Biotechnology and Biological Sciences Research Council from April 2018 to June 2023. She was previously a professor of biochemistry at the University of Bath, where she worked on stem cell biology.

== Early life and education ==
Welham was born and raised in Suffolk. Her father worked in agriculture, and she was the first member of her family to attend university. She studied biochemistry at Imperial College London, where only 15% of undergraduate students were women. She moved to University College London for doctoral research, where she studied the oncogene. She then moved to the University of British Columbia, where she worked as a postdoctoral researcher between 1989 and 1995.

== Research and career ==
Welham joined the University of Bath as a lecturer in 1995, where she worked on molecular signalling and stem cell science. She was the first woman to be promoted to Professor at Bath.

Welham joined Biotechnology and Biological Sciences Research Council (BBSRC) on secondment in 2012. In 2018, Welham was made Executive Chair of BBSRC, two years prior to this, she served as Interim Chief Executive of the Council.

She served as Executive Champion for People, Culture and Talent at UK Research and Innovation. She was made a trustee of the Royal Society of Biology and the University of Bristol in 2023.

She was appointed a DBE for services to the biosciences in the 2023 Birthday Honours.

Welham was awarded an Honorary Doctorate of Science by the University of Bath in January 2025. The award recognises 'her dedication to promoting the values of scientific excellence, interdisciplinary research, career development and equality, diversity and inclusivity in academia.'

== Selected publications ==
- Bart Vanhaesebroeck; Melanie J. Welham; Kei Kotani; et al. (29 April 1997). "p110δ, a novel phosphoinositide 3-kinase in leukocytes". Proceedings of the National Academy of Sciences of the United States of America. 94 (9): 4330–5. Bibcode:1997PNAS...94.4330V. doi:10.1073/pnas.94.9.4330. ISSN 0027-8424. PMC 20722. PMID 9113989. Wikidata Q24314825.
- Nicholas R.D. Paling; Helen Wheadon; Heather K. Bone; Melanie J. Welham (24 August 2004). "Regulation of embryonic stem cell self-renewal by phosphoinositide 3-kinase-dependent signaling". Journal of Biological Chemistry. 279 (46): 48063–48070. doi:10.1074/jbc.m406467200. ISSN 0021-9258. PMID 15328362. Wikidata Q40522498.
- Karen Wright; Nicholas Rooney; Mark Feeney; Jeremy Tate; Duncan Robertson; Melanie Welham; Stephen Ward (1 August 2005). "Differential expression of cannabinoid receptors in the human colon: cannabinoids promote epithelial wound healing". Gastroenterology. 129 (2): 437–453. doi:10.1053/j.gastro.2005.05.026. ISSN 0016-5085. PMID 16083701. Wikidata Q34440704.
