= Kiyoshi Nagai =

Japanese structural biologist (1949–2019)

Kiyoshi Nagai FRS
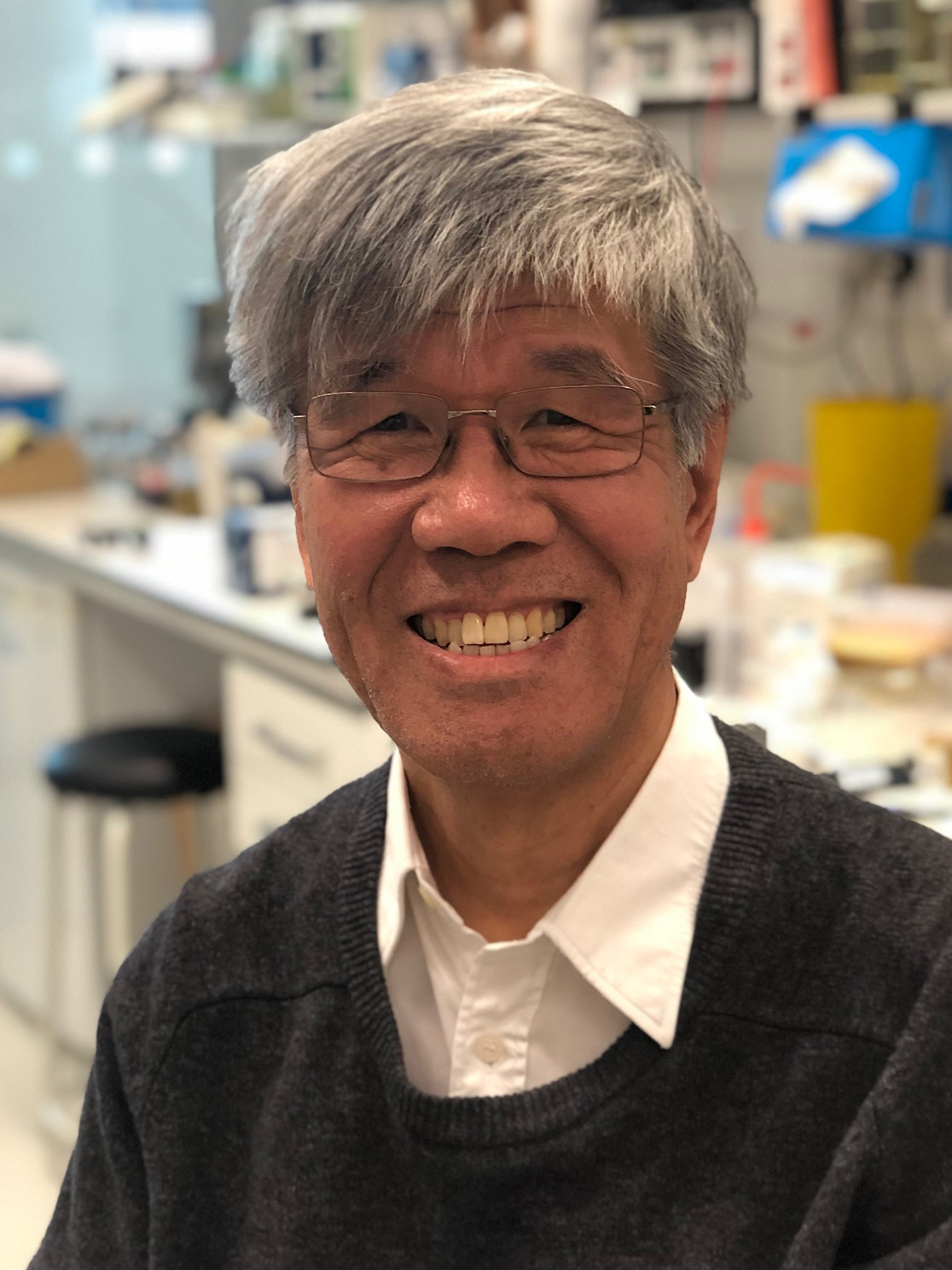
- Kiyoshi Nagai, November 2018
- Born: June 25, 1949; Osaka, Japan
- Died: September 27, 2019 (aged 70); Cambridge, United Kingdom
- Education: Osaka University (BSc, MSc, PhD)
- Awards: EMBO Member (2000); Novartis Medal and Prize (2000)
- Scientific career
- Workplaces: MRC Laboratory of Molecular Biology
- Thesis: (1978)
- Doctoral advisor: Hideki Morimoto
- Website: www2.mrc-lmb.cam.ac.uk/group-leaders/n-to-s/kiyoshi-nagai/

Kiyoshi Nagai FRS (June 25, 1949 – September 27, 2019) was a Japanese structural biologist at the MRC Laboratory of Molecular Biology Cambridge, UK. He was known for his work on the mechanism of RNA splicing and structures of the spliceosome.

== Education ==
Nagai studied at Osaka University and earned a Doctor of Philosophy under the supervision of Hideki Morimoto working on the allosteric effect in hemoglobin.

== Career and research ==
In 1981 Nagai moved to the MRC Laboratory of Molecular Biology where he worked as a post-doc with Max Perutz on overproduction of eukaryotic proteins in E. coli. He produced recombinant hemoglobin and studied its properties and evolution by crystallography and mutagenesis. In 1987 he became a tenured group leader at the LMB and was joint head of the Division of Structural Studies from 2000 to 2010. He was appointed fellow of Darwin College, Cambridge in 1993.

In 1990 his group solved the first structure of an RRM (RNA recognition motif) protein, U1A, and in 1994 showed how it specifically binds RNA. Subsequent work involved crystallographic studies of other components of the spliceosome, a large macromolecular machine that catalyses RNA splicing in eukaryotes, including components of the U2 snRNP and the Sm proteins and culminating in the crystal structures of the full U1 snRNP and the U5 snRNP components Prp8 and Brr2.

From 2014, Nagai's group used cryo-electron microscopy to study the spliceosome. Structures of the U5.U4/U6 tri-snRNP gave the first structural insights into the assembly of the spliceosome. Nagai's subsequent structures of spliceosomes in various stages of assembly and catalysis combined with structures from the groups of Reinhard Lührmann, Yigong Shi and others have provided crucial insight into the catalytic mechanism of pre-mRNA splicing.

=== Awards ===
- 2000 Fellow of the Royal Society
- 1999 Member, European Molecular Biology Organisation (EMBO)
- 2000 Novartis Medal of the Biochemical Society
