= Tony Minson =

British virologist (born 1944)

- Born: 8 February 1944 (age 82); Ilford, Essex, England, UK
- Education: University of Birmingham (BSc); Australian National University (PhD)
- Awards: FMedSci (2002)
- Scientific career
- Workplaces: University of Cambridge; University of Birmingham; Australian National University
- Thesis: Studies of the biosynthesis of histidine in Neurospora crassa (1968)
- Doctoral students: Tony Kouzarides
- Website: www.wolfson.cam.ac.uk/people/professor-anthony-minson

Anthony Charles Minson (born 8 February 1944) is a British virologist known for his work on the biology of herpesviruses, and a university administrator. He was the Senior Pro-Vice-Chancellor of the University of Cambridge from 2003 to 2009. He is an emeritus professor of virology at the university's Department of Pathology and an emeritus fellow of Wolfson College.

== Education and career ==
Born in Ilford, Essex, Minson was educated at Ilford High School and went on to study microbiology at the University of Birmingham in 1965. His postgraduate work was at the Research School of Biological Sciences of the Australian National University, researching fungal genetics with E. H. Creaser. He gained his PhD in 1968 for work on the biosynthesis of histidine in Neurospora crassa.

By the early 1970s, Minson had returned to the University of Birmingham. In 1976, he took up a position as Senior Research Associate at the University of Cambridge. In the mid-1980s, he became head of the Division of Virology and, in 1991, was appointed professor of virology in the Department of Pathology. He is a fellow of Wolfson College.

== Research ==
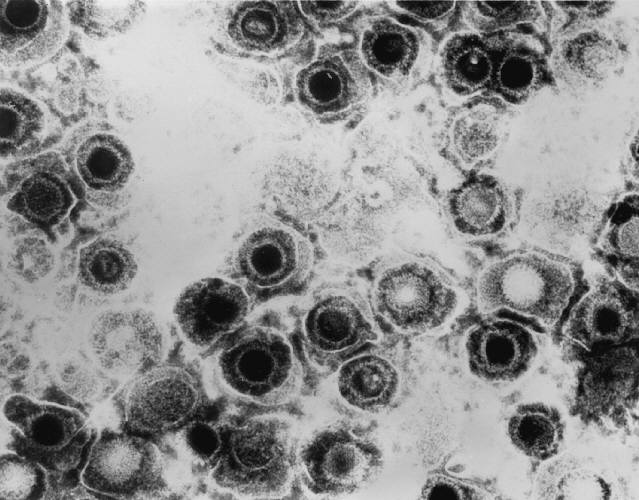
Herpes simplex virus

Since moving to Cambridge, Minson's research has focused on animal viruses, particularly those of the herpesvirus family, including herpes simplex virus (HSV) and human cytomegalovirus. These large and complex enveloped DNA viruses commonly infect humans, causing a lifelong latent infection. Conditions associated with HSV include cold sores and genital herpes, and both HSV and cytomegalovirus can be life-threatening in immunodeficient people. Much of Minson's research has investigated herpesvirus replication and life cycle, viral pathogenesis and the immune response. His work has contributed to understanding the processes by which HSV fuses with the cell membrane and acquires its envelope. As of 2013, his research focuses on herpesvirus entry, in particular how the viral membrane proteins cooperate to induce fusion, as well as assembly, in particular of the viral membrane proteins.

Minson has also worked in collaboration with Margaret Stanley on another DNA virus, human papillomavirus, which is associated with cervical cancer. His research in the early 1970s was in the field of plant viruses, including tobacco rattle virus and tobacco necrosis virus, in collaboration with Graham Darby and others. Leszek Borysiewicz and Geoffrey L. Smith are among his other research collaborators, and notable students have included Tony Kouzarides.

=== Vaccines ===
In the early 1990s, Minson's group was one of several investigating a novel method of attenuating viruses for use in live vaccines. One or more of the genes absolutely required for replication is deleted and the virus is grown in a cell line engineered to express these gene products. The resulting virus can infect normal human cells but should be safe because it cannot replicate in them. Such replication-impaired viruses unite many of the advantages of both live and killed virus vaccines and are much less likely to revert to a more virulent form than earlier methods of attenuation.

Minson and co-workers pioneered a modification of this approach in which the disabled virus is restricted to a single cycle of replication. Using HSV-2, which causes genital herpes, they disabled the virus by deleting the viral gene encoding the membrane protein glycoprotein H (gH). This product is not required until after the viral assembly process, which means that the disabled virus can undergo a single round of replication in normal human cells, but the progeny virus cannot infect new cells. Minson's group called the resulting virus a "disabled infectious single cycle" (DISC) virus; similarly disabled viruses are also termed "single-cycle" viruses. Their work with DISC HSV-2 led to a series of vaccine candidates, which were developed by Cantab Pharmaceuticals. The DISC HSV-2 vaccine was promising in animal models and early clinical trials, appearing safe and well tolerated, and eliciting appropriate immune responses. However, a large phase II trial of the agent as a therapeutic vaccine in people with genital herpes failed to demonstrate any benefit, and further development has concentrated on the DISC HSV-2 vaccine's potential to prevent infection. The single-cycle strategy can be used to generate live vaccines against other viruses, and such a vaccine has recently been successfully developed for the bluetongue virus of sheep. Single-cycle viruses are also widely used as vaccine vectors, carrying genes from other viruses.

=== Detection ===
In the early 2000s, a collaboration between Minson and Matthew Cooper's group from the University of Cambridge's chemistry department pioneered a novel acoustic technique for detecting viruses. The technique allows a single virus particle to be detected in a sample and has the potential for use as a quick yet sensitive monitor of viral infection. The researchers co-founded the company Akubio in 2001 to exploit the discovery; the company developed biosensors for detecting bacteria and viruses. It was acquired by Inverness Medical Innovations in 2008.

=== Taxonomy ===
Minson is a long-term member of the International Committee on Taxonomy of Viruses (ICTV) Study Group that defines herpesvirus taxonomy. In 2008, as a result of the group's deliberations on research into herpesvirus genetics, the ICTV promoted the herpesvirus family to an order and split it into three families.

== Science and university administration ==
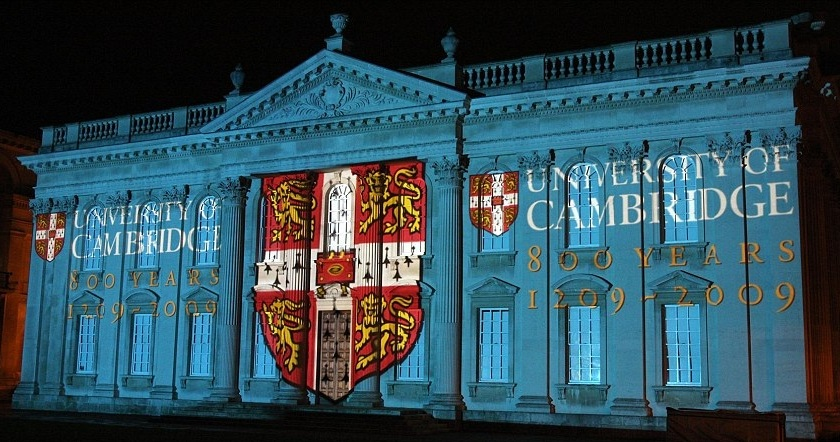
Senate House, centre of the university's government, lit up for the 800th anniversary

Minson has been highly active in university administration. In 2001–3, he chaired the School of Biological Sciences, one of the six schools of the University of Cambridge. In 2003, he was appointed Pro-Vice-Chancellor of the university, in succession to Malcolm Grant. Minson was the first, and most senior, of a new team of five Pro-Vice-Chancellors, holding particular responsibility for planning and resources. He said of his role: We have a duty to maintain the university's values of scientific enquiry and scholarship whilst embracing the principles of sustainable, achievable reform. He served in this position until 2009, the university's 800th anniversary year. Soon after his appointment, he was thrown into controversy over his strong support for a proposed new primate research centre attached to the university, which was the target of a campaign by animal rights activists. The plans were later abandoned because of escalating costs, due in part to the activism. In 2005, the university launched a major fund-raising campaign to mark the 800th anniversary; the £1 billion target was achieved ahead of schedule in 2010.

Minson has also served on the steering committee of the multidisciplinary Cambridge Infectious Disease group, launched in 2004. In 2010–12, he chaired the syndicate governing Cambridge University Press. Outside the university, he served on the council of the Society for General Microbiology in 1990–94 and 2003–7, and (as of 2012) is the reviews editor of their journal, the Journal of General Virology. He was an officer of the Biotechnology and Biological Sciences Research Council's Institute for Animal Health (now the Pirbright Institute) from 1997–2003. As of 2013, Minson is on the board of the Lister Institute of Preventive Medicine and is a trustee of the Animal Health Trust.

He has drawn attention to the cost of bureaucracy imposed on researchers by government agencies, writing in 2004:

To be against improvement in standards is like being against motherhood, but we should be alert to the dangers of universal codes of practice imposed for administrative tidiness. The fact is that the great scientific leaps of the past 50 years have not been made in laboratories using validated standard operating procedures, well-defined line-management systems, and 6-monthly milestones.

== Awards and honours ==
Minson was elected a fellow of the Academy of Medical Sciences in 2002. He was elected an honorary member of the Society for General Microbiology in 2011.
