= Lasso =

Loop of rope used as restraint

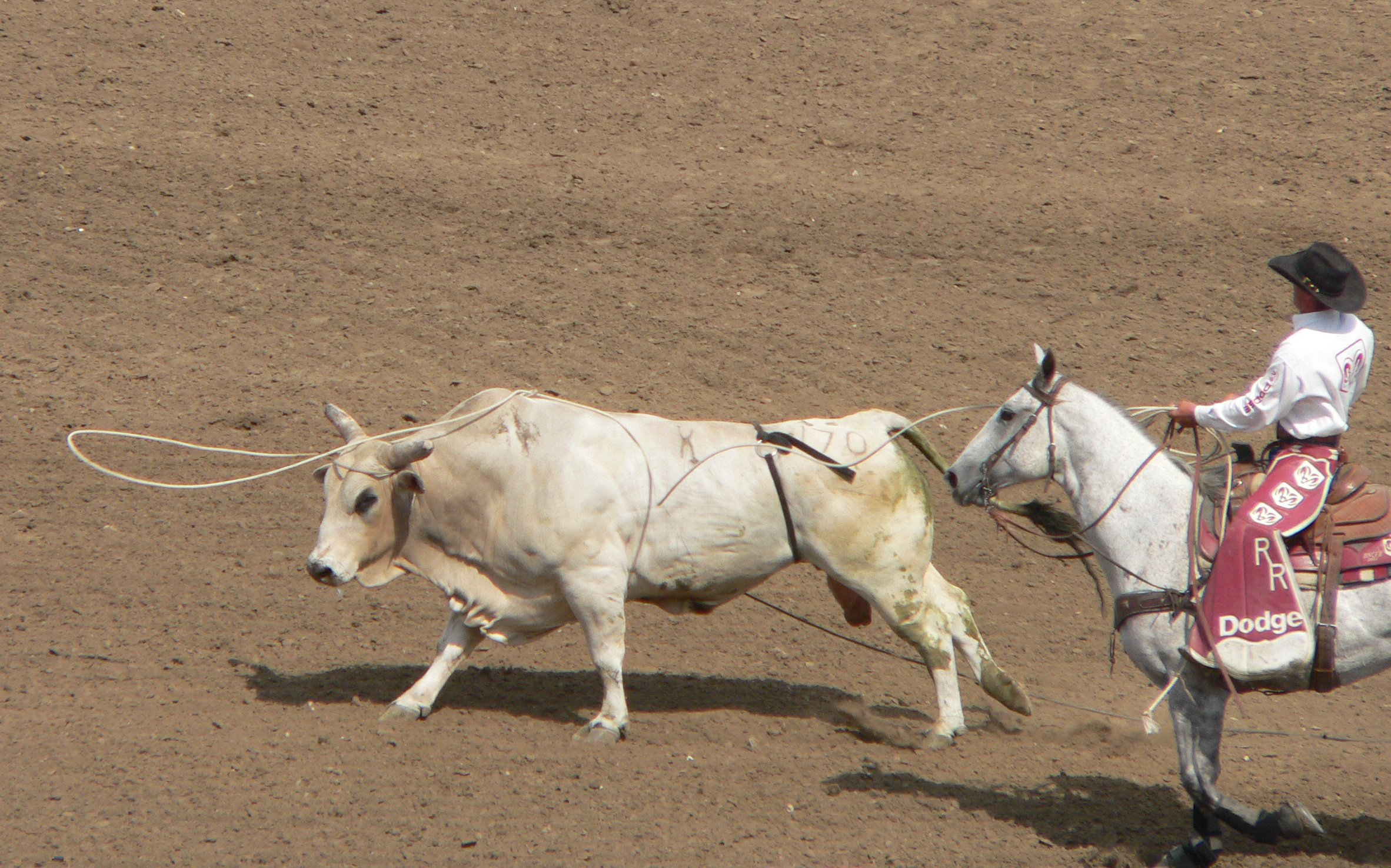
A loose bull is lassoed by a pickup rider during a rodeo in Salinas, California, July 2006

A lasso or lazo (/ˈlæsoʊ/ or /læˈsuː/), also called reata or la reata in Mexico, and in the United States riata or lariat (from Mexican Spanish lasso for roping cattle), is a loop of rope designed as a restraint to be thrown around a target and tightened when pulled. It is a well-known tool of the Mexican and South American cowboys, which was then adopted from the Mexicans by the cowboys of the United States. The word is also a verb; to lasso is to throw the loop of rope around something.

== Etymology ==
The word lasso seems to have begun to be used as an English word in the early nineteenth century. It may have originated from the Castilian word lazo, which is first attested in the thirteenth century in the sense 'noose, snare', and derives in turn from classical Latin laqueus ('noose, snare, trap, bond, tie').

In Spain a “reata” is a group of donkeys, mules, or horses tied together

The rope or lasso used to restrain cattle is also called reata or la reata in Mexico, which was Anglicized to “Lariat” or “Riata” in the United States. In Mexico reata is basically used as a synonym for rope, a colloquialism, specifically the one used for capturing cattle and other livestock. But in its original Castilian Spanish (in Spain) definition, reata means a group of horses, mules or donkeys tied together to go in a straight line or the leading mule of three that draw a cart and, in nautical settings, a rope for binding masts and spars (woolding).

Other names are used in various countries where the Lasso is used. In Argentina, Chile and Venezuela is simply called “El Lazo” or “El Lazo Criollo” (the native lasso). In Colombia the equipment is called “Rejo”, in Costa Rica “Coyunda”, in Ecuador “Beta”, and Peru “Guasca”. Meanwhile in Colombia, the term Reata or Riata means: hardened, firm, rigid, severe; it also refers to a belt for pants.

== History ==
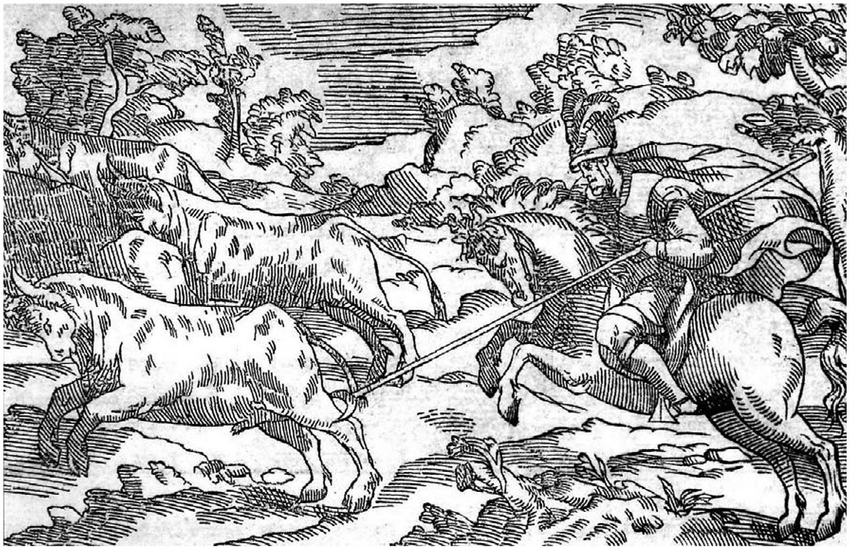
Cacería del Toro Cimarron (Hunting Wild Bulls in Colonial Mexico, 1582)

Cattle roping from horseback originated in Hispanic America between the late 16th and early 17th centuries, although the precise origin is unknown, and developed throughout the next 200 years. Before the development of roping, the original tool of the early cowherds (vaqueros) of the Americas was the desjarretadera, a lance with a crescent moon shaped blade at one of its ends used to incapacitate cattle by cutting their hocks or hamstrings. Known in English as a “hocking knife”, “desjarretadera” comes from the Spanish prefix “des-“ meaning “to remove”, and “jarrete” meaning “hock” (dehocker); it was also known as a ”lanza de media luna” (crescent-moon blade lance) or simply "luna" (moon).

A vaquero on horseback, carrying the desjarretadera, would gallop at full speed behind a wild bull and, positioning himself slightly to one side, would hit the back, the hock, of one of its legs, slicing through the flesh and cutting the nerves, thus, incapacitating the bull. The vaquero would then dismount and finish the bull off by stabbing it at the base of its neck, and would then skin it and remove the tallow, leaving the rest to rot. This activity was done in the early stages of cattle ranching in the Americas when the only thing valuable were the hides and tallow. The desjarretadera would later on be used as a weapon used primarily by militias.

The oldest mention of anything close to “roping from horseback” in the Americas was not about cattle but about wild horses. In Friar Diego de Ocaña’s travels through the province of Paraguay in 1601, he wrote about the great quantities of wild horses that inhabited the area and how the natives would capture them on horseback, bareback, by a rudimentary roping method utilizing a rope of which one end was tied behind the horse’s brazuelos (the forearm or gaskin) while the other end was made into a noose fastened to a pole, Ocaña writes:

[…]he carries in his hand the end of the rope made into a lasso tied around a long pole, and when he reaches the colt, he places the rope over its head and when the horse chasing the colt feels when the other one is captured, stops and holds with his legs and pulls back as if it were a person.

Neither Ocaña nor other writers before or after him ever mentioned this method being used to rope cattle in that region. The method sounds similar to the Mongolian method of capturing horses using the “uurga” with the exception that the rope was fastened to the horse’s body. If this method was independently developed here or brought from the outside is unknown since there is no evidence whatsoever of its existence in Spain before the arrival of the Spanish to the Americas.

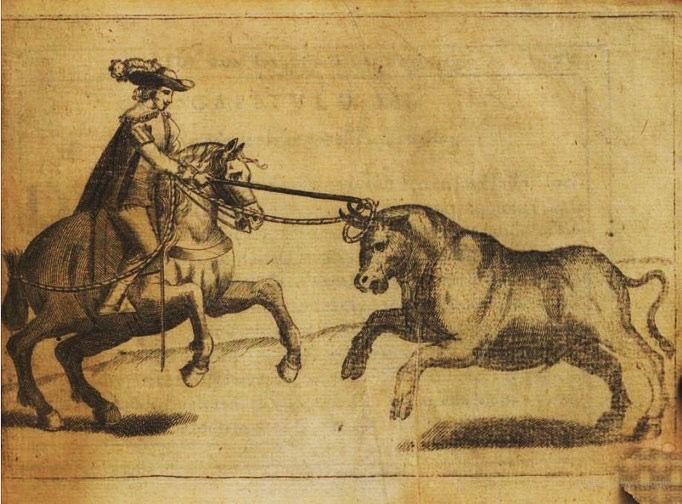
“How to lasso a bull ” by Gregorio de Tapia y Salcedo (1643).

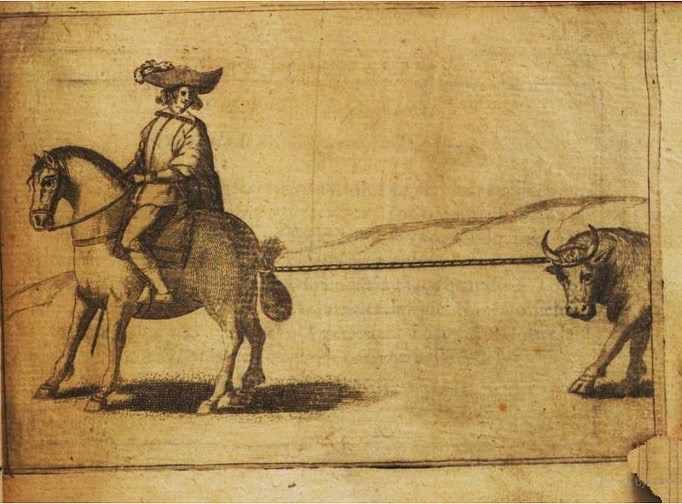
“How to work with the lassoed bull ” by Gregorio de Tapia y Salcedo (1643).

A similar method was also used by the Jarocho of “Tierra-Caliente” Veracruz. Jarocho were vaqueros of the Veracruz region of mulato and African descent. Their saddle did not have a horn since a garrocha was their primary tool when working with cattle but rather a heavy, crude saddle, with long corazas (embossed leather covering), without tapaderas (stirrup coverings) on the stirrups, and was overloaded with ornaments. Their reata or lazo was called peal (unlike the reata of the Charros), and was tied to their horse's tail, and was made of twisted, not braided, rawhide, dried in the sun and softened with tallow.

The first documented evidence of cattle roping from horseback would not appear until 1643, in Exercicios de la Gineta, a book about jineta (Note: An Arab or African riding method in which the rider rode with shorter stirrups, with his legs bent, allowing the rider a more direct and precise contact of the "lower aids" with the horse's sides, sitting firmly in the center of the saddle, keeping the feet firmly resting on the stirrups; it was the typical riding method of light cavalry. This form of riding was introduced to Spain by the Moors, and the Spaniards introduced it to Mexico in the 16th century where it was refined and perfected gaining greater prominence, acquiring a distinct “New World” style and form.) horsemanship by Gregorio de Tapia y Salcedo, a caballero of the Order of Santiago. In it he describes how two Black slaves from the Americas performed an extraordinary feat in a bullring in Madrid during a bullfight. They entered on horseback each carrying in his hand a pole of 13 palmos (approx. 1.5 meters), that had one end of a rope made into a noose tied around it while the other end was fastened to their horse’s tail. As the bull was let out, the Black horsemen approached it and one placed the noose around the bull’s horns. He goes on to say that even though they sometimes failed at “roping” the bull they kept trying until they succeeded. Salcedo says that this peculiar feat caused great sensation among the people and the Royal Court indicating it was completely unknown in Spain, and continues on to say:

After having placed the lasso on the horns, the horseman releases the rope held in his left hand, and they stand on one side of the ring or field, where it is being done, with the bull held by the horns and the tail of the horse. The horse shows such strength that even at the greatest urge of the bull to drag it, the bull is unable to move it (something that frightened everyone, and which could not be believed if one had not seen it; because the bull ends up as if it had been tied to a pillar) and at that moment the people on foot enter, and can very easily hamstring it, and do everything they want. And the one who is on horseback, going around the bull, entangles the bull’s hind and forelegs so that pulling the rope, and tightening the turns, knocks it down.

The precise origin of these two Black slaves who performed this extraordinary feat is unknown as Salcedo never went into detail just stating they were from the Americas (the Indies). As such, we can never exactly pinpoint where such a method originated and we can also never know how wide spread it was.

Andrew Sluyter, a social scientist and professor at the Louisiana State University, argues that roping cattle from horseback originated in Mexico. He asserts that certain ranching laws enacted by the Mexican Mesta, the government association regulating ranching, targeted Black, Mulatto Indian and Mestizo vaqueros disproportionately with harsher punishments for violating them, including corporal punishment. Due to the indiscriminate killing of female cattle and, as a result, the subsequent decline of the herds, the great set of laws passed by the Mesta in January 1574 included a law that ordered that no Blacks, Mulattos, Mestizos or Indians who are or had been employed as vaqueros were allowed to own or keep desjarretaderas and garrochas (lances), under penalty of 20 gold pesos, a 10 month salary or more for the average vaquero. For those that were unable to pay, the punishment was at least 100 lashes in public. Black and mulatto slaves fared worst since they received no salary, so the automatic punishment was lashing. According to Sluyter, black and mulatto vaqueros developed roping from horseback as an alternative way for capturing cattle, circumventing the law.

Sluyter also argues that the invention of the saddle-horn also points to Mexico as the origin of roping from horseback. According to him, the saddle with a horn for roping was the invention of these Black and Mulatto vaqueros, whose African elite ancestors knew about horns on saddles, not for roping or even herding cattle, but for hanging bags. The West African saddles, says Sluyter, look strikingly similar to the saddles developed in Mexico. The fact that there is no evidence whatsoever of the existence of horned saddles in Spain nor in any other European country, points to an African-Mexican origin. Another possible clue is that many Mexican herdsmen in the 18th century would fastened their lasso on their horses' tails, as those Black horsemen in Madrid did, a method that would continue into the 19th century in Veracruz by the Jarochos, the vaqueros of that region, who were mostly of Black descent. Although the Llaneros of Venezuela also use this method, and continue to do so, they never developed the intricate form of roping that Mexican herdsmen did.

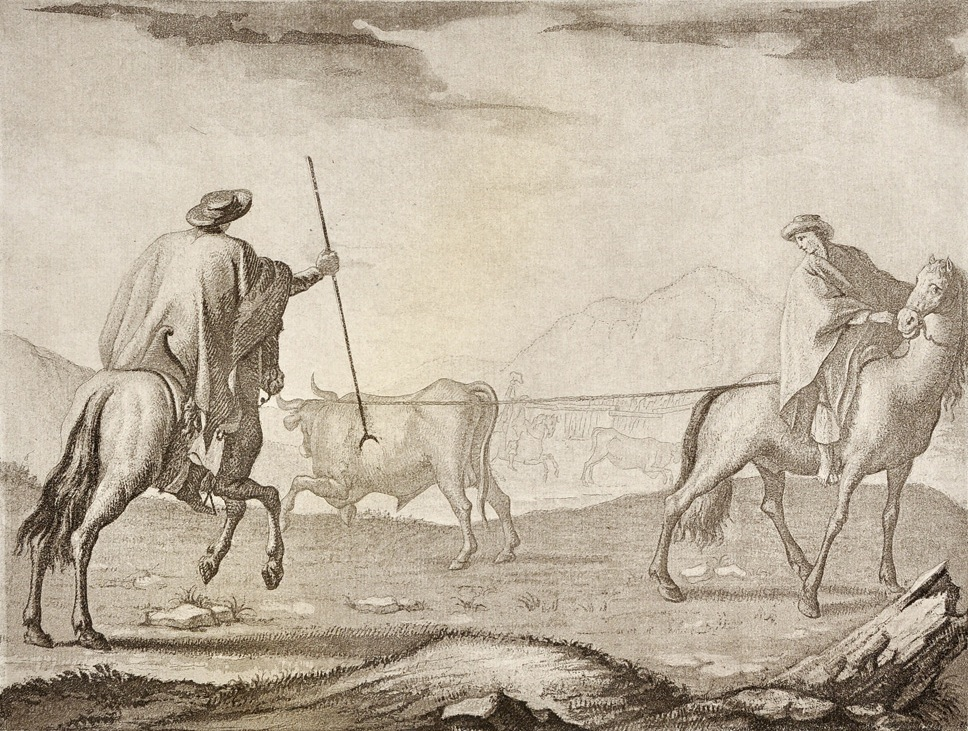
Gauchos roping in conjunction with the desjarretadera (1794).

By the 18th century, roping from horseback for the purpose of herding and capturing cattle was widely spread throughout Hispanic-America, from the Pampas in South America to the northern frontier of New Spain. The cumbersome pole once used was discarded, they were now roping more dexterously by throwing the lasso. Nonetheless, it was still very rudimentary as the herdsmen were roping in conjunction with garrochas (lances) and desjarretaderas which were still being used to drive and incapacitate cattle, respectively. One vaquero would lasso and hold a bull while another one with a desjarretadera would perform the necessary tasks. Jesuit priest Rafael Landivar vividly described in epic verse how bull hunts were performed in the Province of Mexico in 1782, stating that vaqueros would arm themselves with different weapons, some with garrochas, others with desjarretaderas and most with lassos fastened to their horses’ tails.

Also, a great deal of the roping was done on foot, including in Mexico where most of the well known roping techniques, like team roping hadn’t been invented yet. If a bull had to be captured and laid down, one vaquero had to first rope it, either by the horns or head, while another one, on foot, had to grab its tail and pull it down. Ignaz Pfefferkorn, a Jesuit missionary who visited Sonora in the 1760’s explained how the capturing and slaughtering of cattle was done at the time with roping, garrochas and tailing:

As soon as they are locked in [the cattle], the mounted cowherds enter. Each carries in his hand a noosed rope, which he throws around one of the animal’s horns. The other end of the rope he quickly winds three or four times around the saddle horn and gallops away. The noose is tightened by the pull of the running horse, and the animal is caught. All this is done with astonishing dexterity and almost in an instant. The roped animal may follow along blindly, though sometimes it is obstinate and will not move from the spot. In this case another cowherd comes up with the garrocha, pokes the stubborn animal in the ribs, and forces it to run. […] Then, when the animal has been brought to the slaughtering place, the rider, with the aid of the horse, pulls the rope with all his might. At the same time a man on foot seizes the tail of the animal, with one or more swings throws the animal to earth, falls instantly upon it, binds its legs together, and cuts its throat.

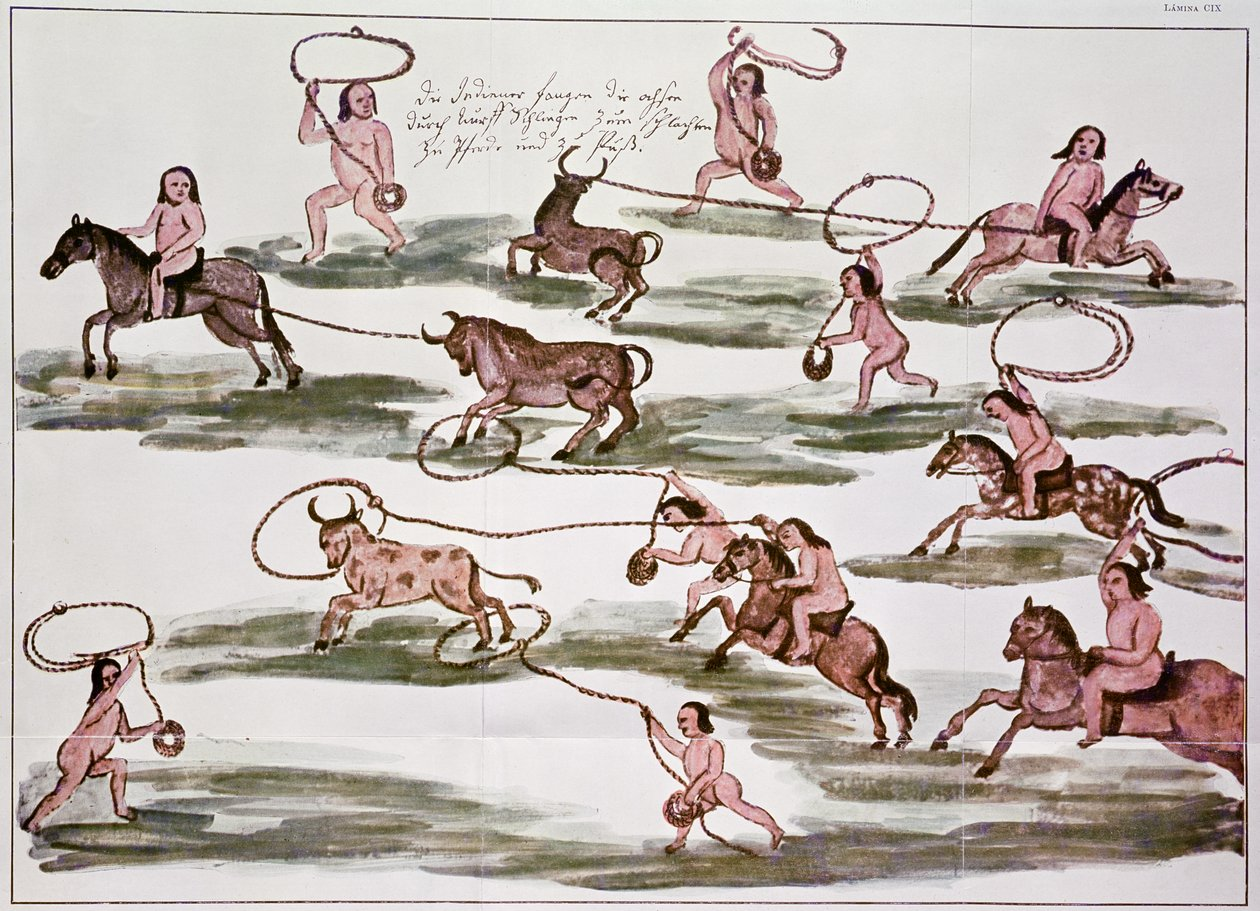
Mocoví roping cattle. Without a saddle horn, people on foot had to help anchor the rope.

From the rudimentary roping of the 18th century, various distinct roping styles would emerge: Charro, Gaucho, Huaso, Llanero, Chagra and Montubio and Qorilazo.

- Charro: a more intricate or “refined” form of roping that implements and executes distinct loops in different situations, either for work or for simple showmanship, and it’s supported by the use of the saddle-horn to which the lasso is secured. For this reason all roping can be done on horseback.
- Gaucho: a straightforward yet effective form of roping that emphasizes speed over everything else, with no concern for the well-being of the animal. Due to the lack of a saddle-horn, the lasso is secured on the cinch underneath the saddle. This provides less stability and for this reason a large amount of the roping has to be done on foot.
- Huaso: similar to Gaucho roping, simple yet effective, limited by the lack of a saddle-horn.
- Llanero: an extremely simple and tedious form of roping, very slow, described by Scottish writer and journalist Cunninghame Graham as “not lassoing but fishing” with the rope. They’re also limited by the fact that their lassos are fastened to their horses’ tails, even though their saddles had, historically, horns but were just ornamental.
- Chagra: Similar to both Gaucho and Huaso roping as they implement the same methods, even though they have saddle-horns they do a great deal of their roping on foot as they never developed and don’t use the methods used in Mexico for roping the legs such as piales (heel shots) and manganas (forefoot shots) from horseback.
- Qorilazo: Similar to the Chagra, they have saddle-horns but do a lot of their roping from horseback in conjunction with roping on foot.

=== Before the Americas ===
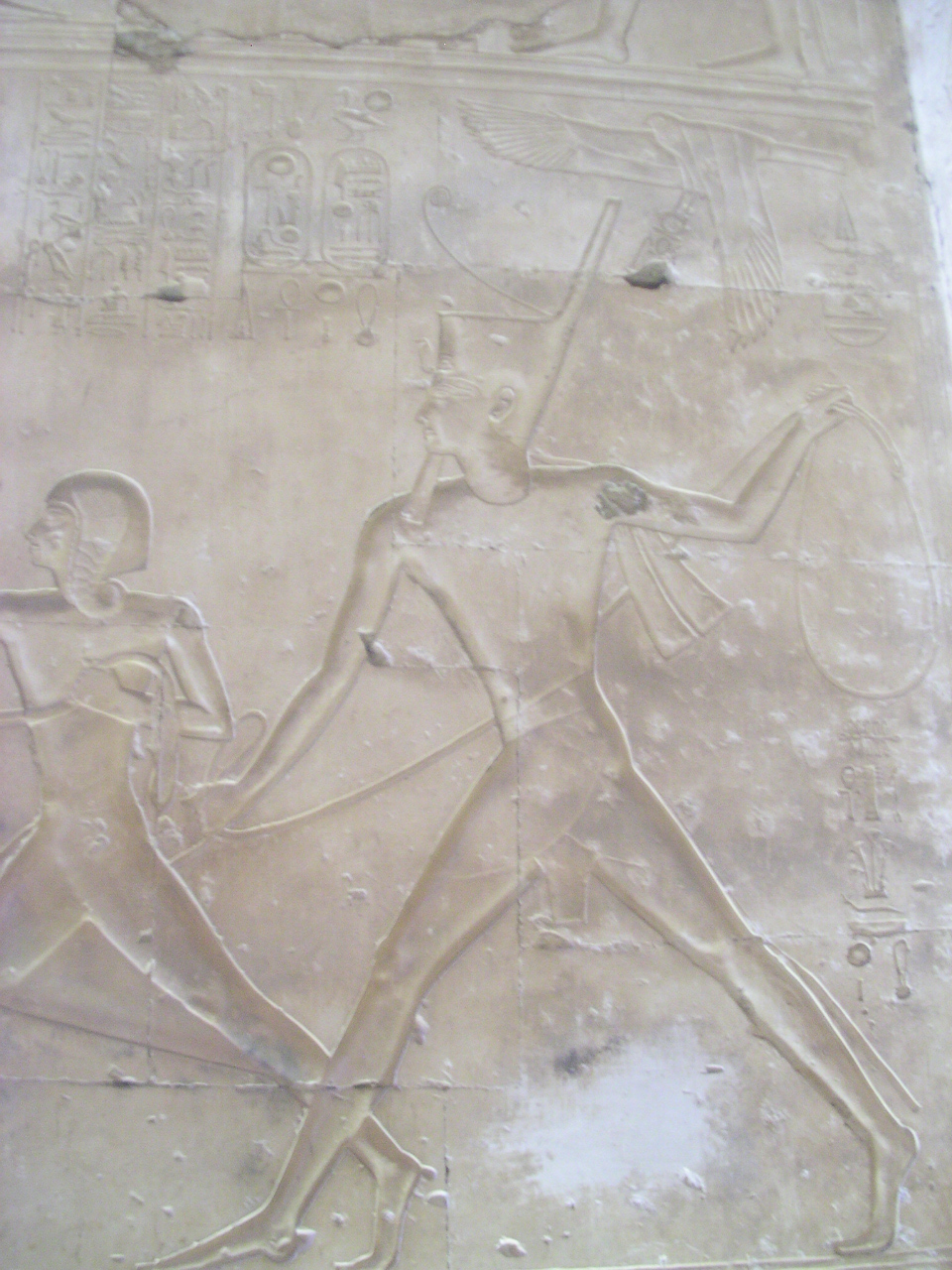
Pharaoh ready to rope the sacred bull; a carving at the temple of Seti I, Abydos northwest of Luxor, Egypt

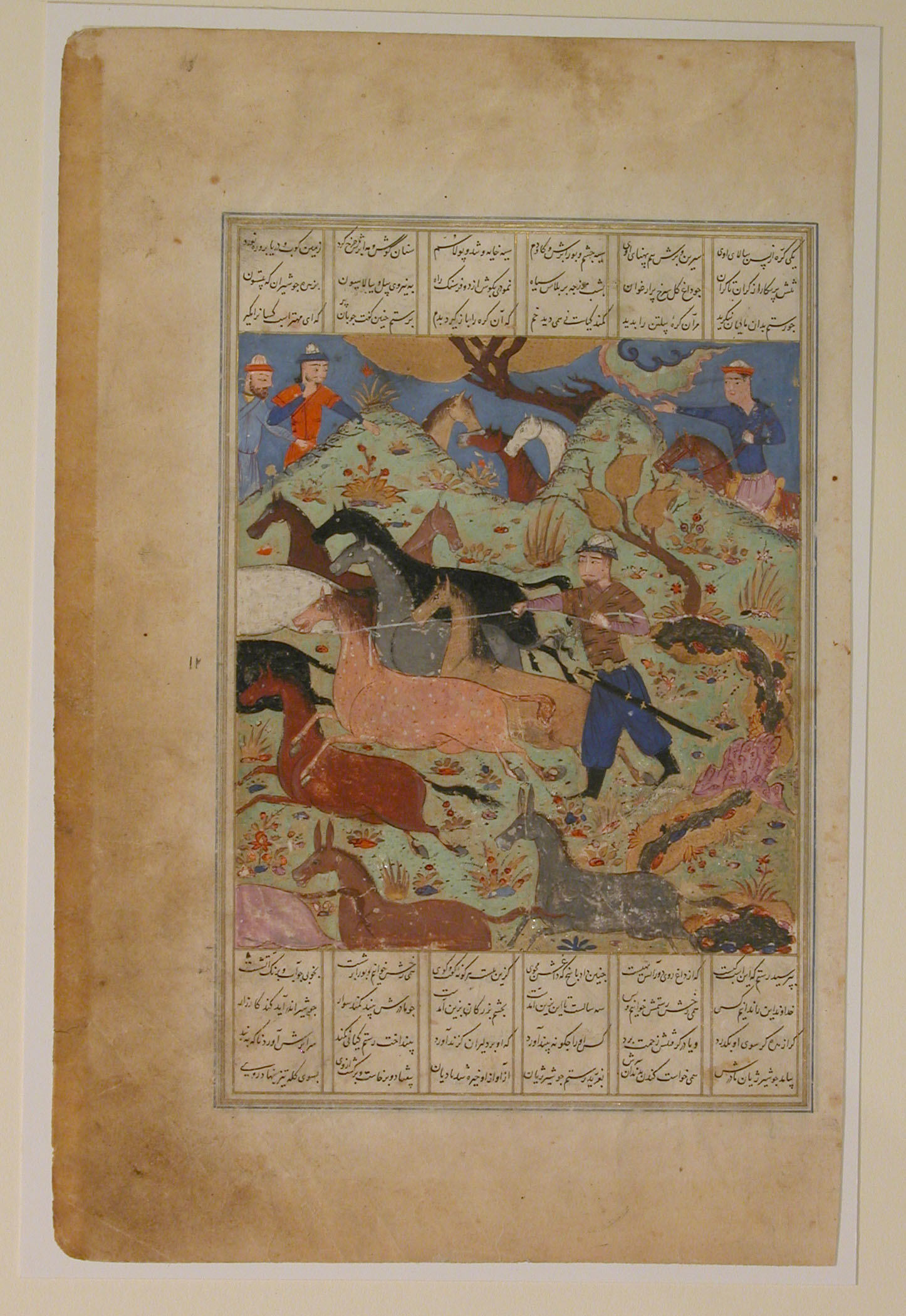
Rustam Lassos the horse Rakhsh (ca. 1450). In the vast majority of the Old World, lassoing was generally done on foot when done for livestock management.

Lasso were known to the indigenous peoples of Latin America who employed them as weapons. Lassos are not only part of North American culture; relief carvings at the ancient Egyptian temple of Pharaoh Seti I at Abydos, built c.1280 BC, show the pharaoh holding a lasso, then holding onto a bull roped around the horns. Huns are recorded as using lassos in battle to ensnare opponents prepared to defend themselves in hand-to-hand combat around AD 370. They were also used by Tatars and are still used by the Sami people and Finns in reindeer herding. In Mongolia, a variant of the lasso called an uurga (Mongolian: уурга) is used, consisting of a rope loop at the end of a long pole.

Lassos are also mentioned in the Greek Histories of Herodotus; seventh book. Polymnia 7.85 records: "The wandering tribe known by the name of Sagartians – a people Persian in language, and in dress half Persian, half Pactyan, who furnished the army as many as eight thousand horse. It is not the wont of this people to carry arms, either of bronze or steel, except only a dirk; but they use lassos made of thongs plaited together, and trust to these whenever they go to the wars. Now the manner in which they fight is the following: when they meet their enemy, straightway they discharge their lassos, which end in a noose; then, whatever the noose encircles, be it man or be it horse, they drag towards them; and the foe, entangled in the toils, is forthwith slain. Such is the manner in which this people fight; and now their horsemen were drawn up with the Persians". Lasso is mentioned by some sources as being one of the pieces of equipment of the Aswaran, the cavalry force of the Sasanian Empire.

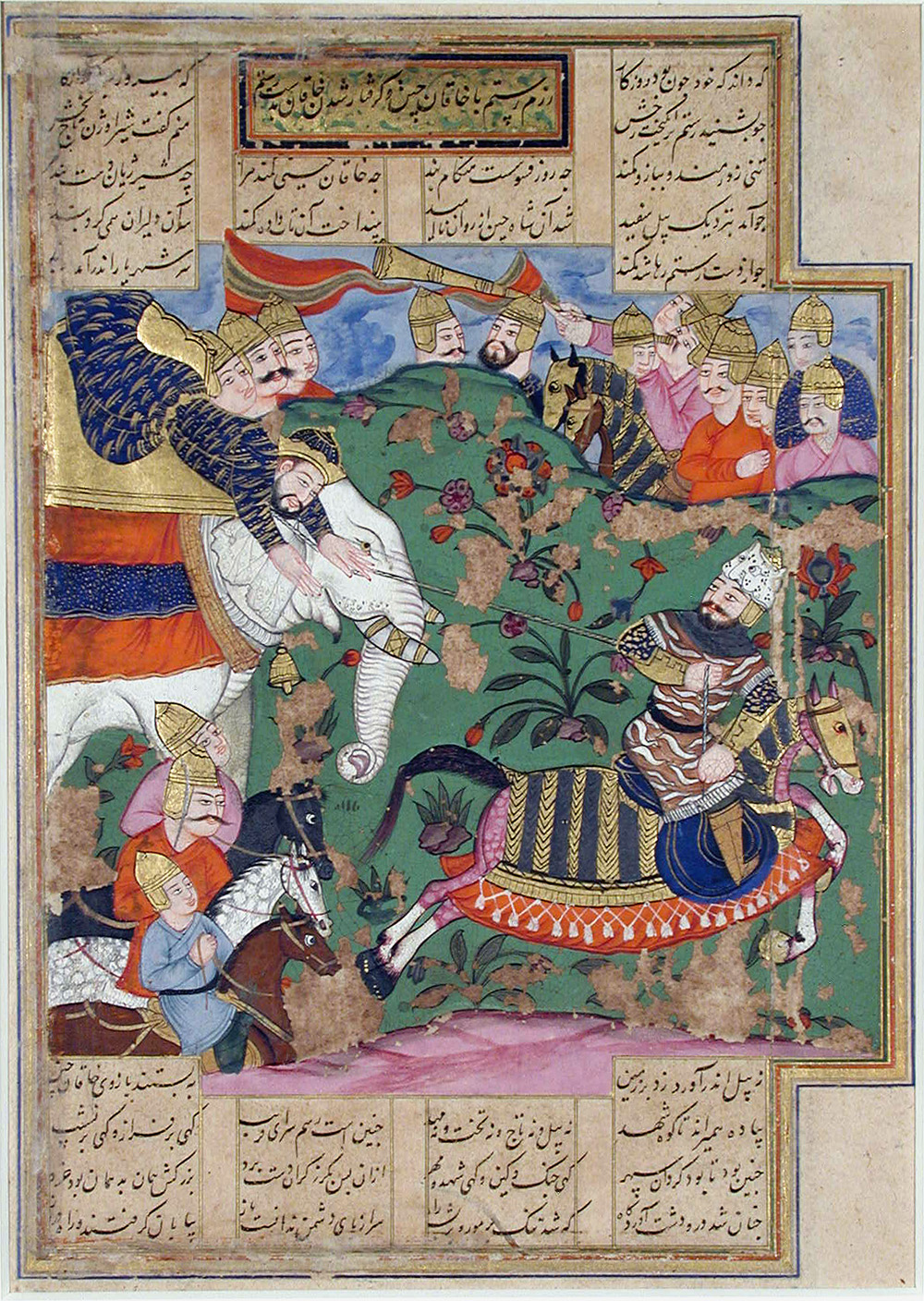
"Rustam Lassoes the Khaqan of China from His White Elephant". In the ancient world, lassos were generally used as weapons of war.

In the vast majority of these cases the lassos were used as weapons for war. When used for herding purposes it was generally done on foot, typically within the confines of an enclosure, in very rudimentary ways. Other such examples include the maut or arkan lasso of the Siberian natives for herding reindeer.

== Overview ==
A lasso is made from stiff rope so that the noose stays open when the lasso is thrown. It also allows the cowboy to easily open up the noose from horseback to release the cattle because the rope is stiff enough to be pushed a little. A high quality lasso is weighted for better handling. The lariat has a small reinforced loop at one end, called a honda or hondo, through which the rope passes to form a loop. The honda can be formed by a honda knot (or another loop knot), an eye splice, a seizing, rawhide, or a metal ring. The other end is sometimes tied simply in a small, tight, overhand knot to prevent fraying. Most modern lariats are made of stiff nylon or polyester rope, usually about 5/16 or 3/8 in (8 or 9.5 mm) diameter and in lengths of 28, 30, or 35 ft (8.5, 9 or 11 m) for arena-style roping and anywhere from 45 to 70 ft (14 to 21 m) for Californio-style roping. The reata is made of braided (or less commonly, twisted) rawhide and is made in lengths from 50 ft (15 m) to over 100 ft (30 m). Mexican maguey (agave) and cotton ropes are also used in the longer lengths.

The lasso is used today in rodeos as part of the competitive events such as calf roping and team roping. It is also used on working ranches to capture cattle or other livestock when necessary. After catching the cattle, the lasso can be tied or wrapped (dallied) around the horn, a typical feature on the front of a western saddle. With the lasso around the horn, the cowboy can use his horse analogously to a tow truck with a winch.

Part of the historical culture of both the vaqueros of Mexico and the cowboys of the Western United States is a related skill now called "trick roping", a performance of assorted lasso spinning tricks. The Hollywood film star Will Rogers was a well-known practitioner of trick roping and the natural horsemanship practitioner Buck Brannaman also got his start as a trick roper when he was a child.

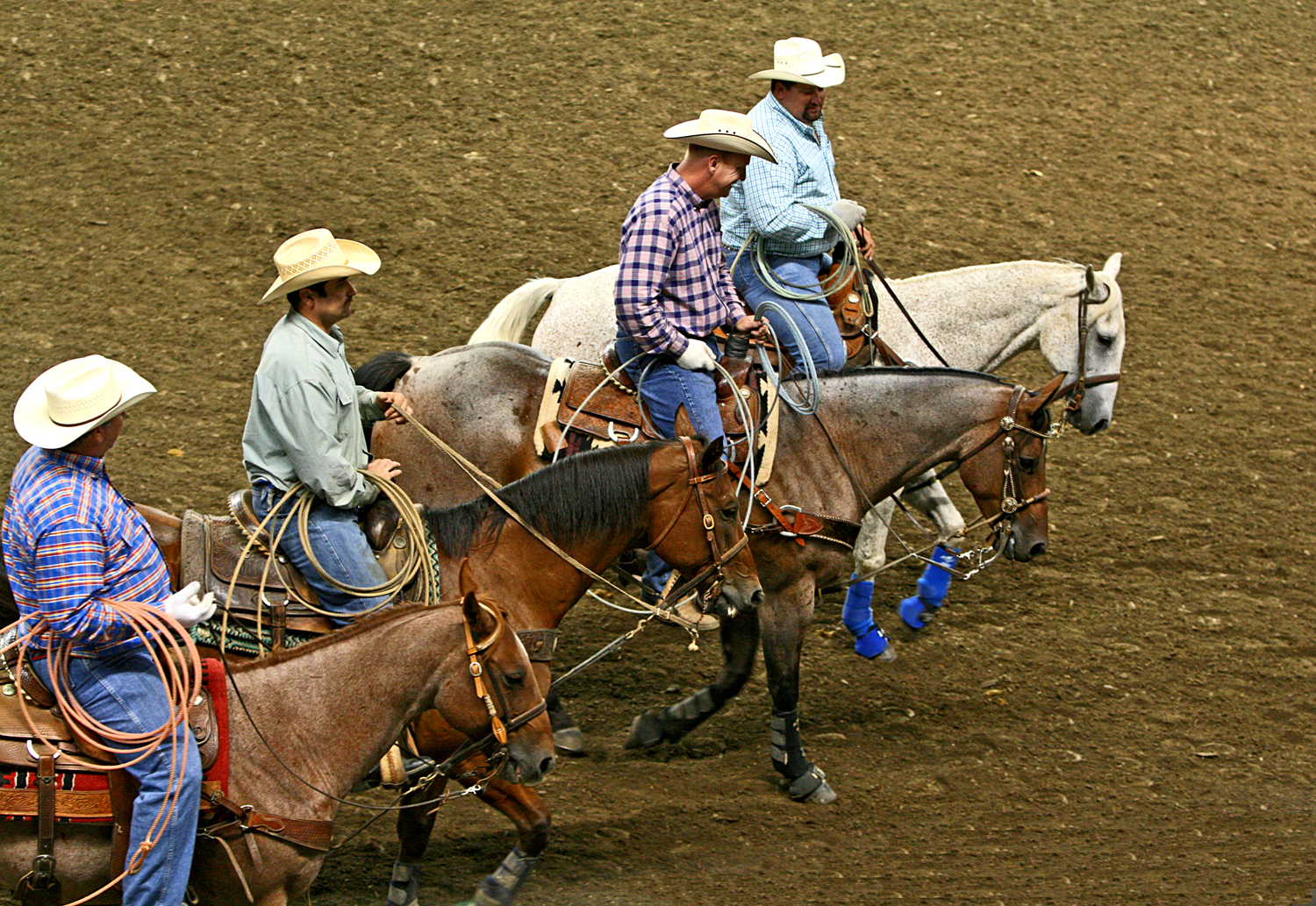
Riders carrying modern lassos for competition in team roping at the Kentucky State Fair, 2008

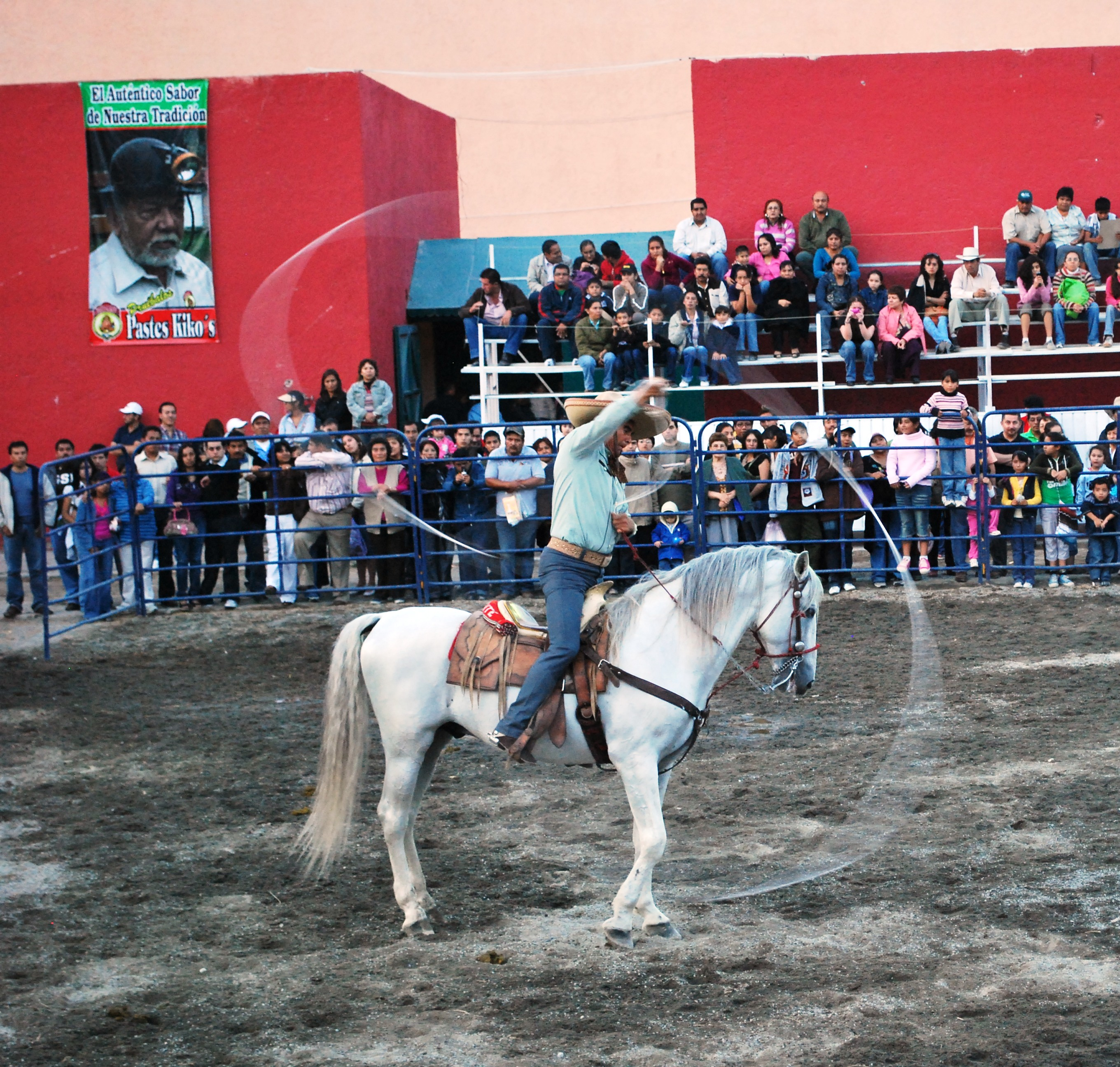
A charro with a lariat at a horse show in Pachuca northwest of Puebla, Mexico, October 2009

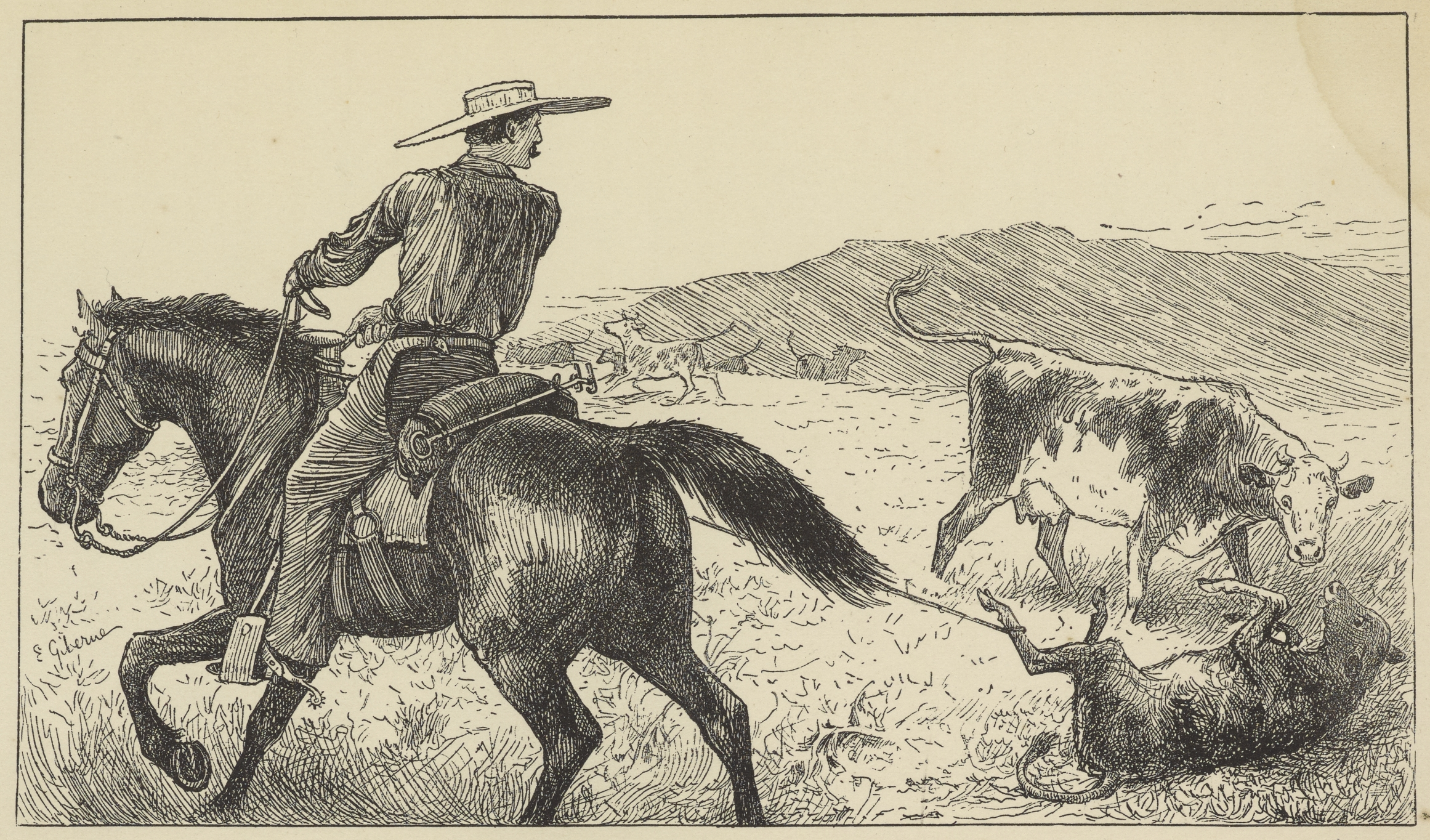
Lassoing on the prairie (from the book Prairie Experiences in Handling Cattle and Sheep, by Major W. Shepherd, 1884)

== See also ==
- Bolas
- Hogtie
- Lasso tool
