= Tony Kouzarides =

English biologist (born 1958)

Sir Tony Kouzarides
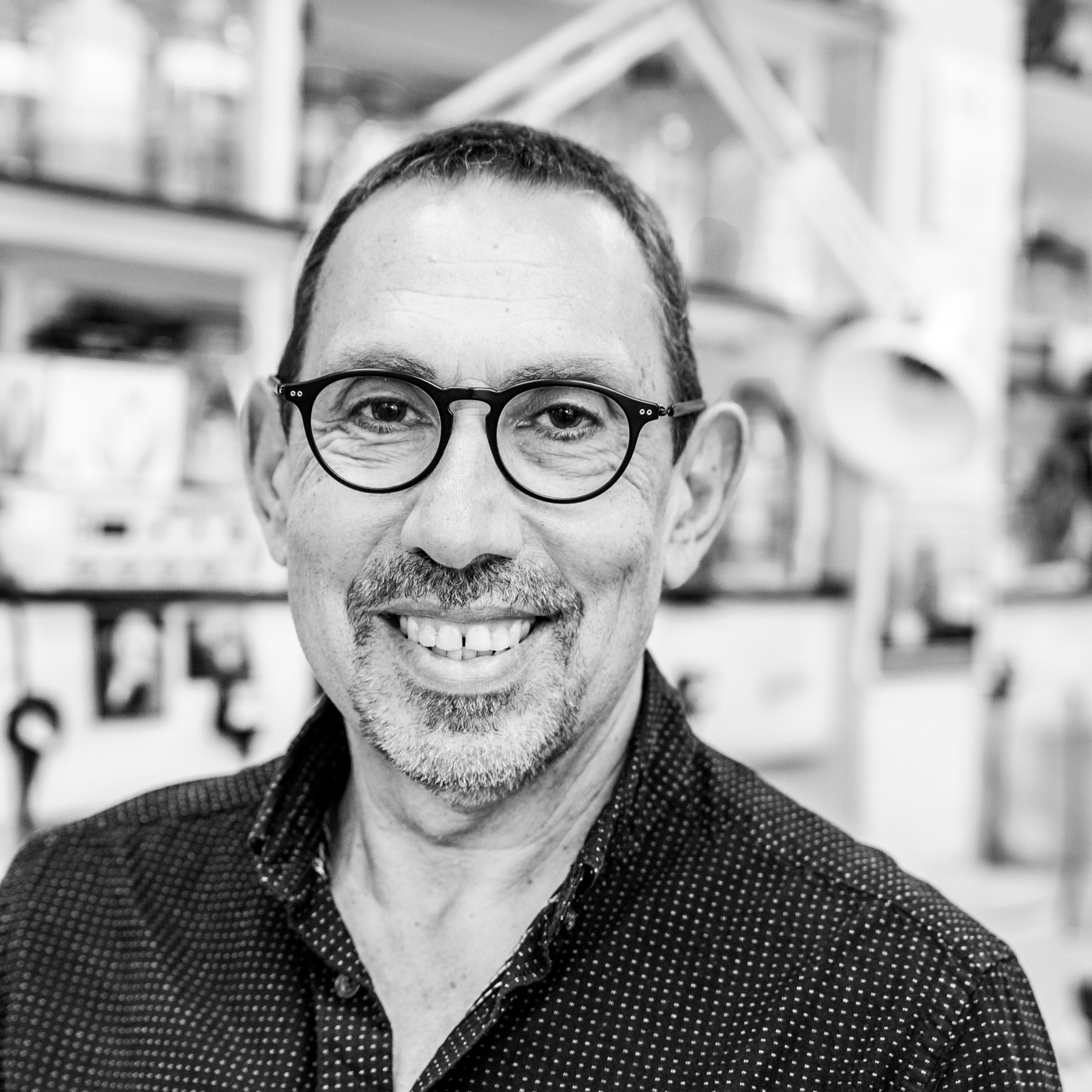
- Born: 17 January 1958 (age 68)
- Education: University of Leeds (BSc); University of Cambridge (PhD)
- Awards: Heinrich Wieland Prize (2013); Fellow of the Royal Society (2012); FMedSci (2001)
- Scientific career
- Fields: Cancer; Chromatin; Transcription
- Workplaces: University of Leeds; University of Cambridge; Gurdon Institute; New York University; Laboratory of Molecular Biology; Abcam
- Thesis: A molecular analysis of transformation by human cytomegalovirus (1985)
- Doctoral advisor: Tony Minson
- Website: www.gurdon.cam.ac.uk/~kouzarideslab royalsociety.org/people/tony-kouzarides

Sir Tony Kouzarides (born 17 January 1958) is an English biologist who is a senior group leader at the Gurdon Institute, a founding non-executive director of Abcam and a professor of Cancer Biology at the University of Cambridge.

== Education ==
Tony Kouzarides did his PhD at the University of Cambridge and his postdoctoral work at MRC Laboratory of Molecular Biology in Cambridge. After his studies, he joined NYU Medical Center in New York where he worked on the c-Fos oncoprotein and the characterization of the leucine zipper.

== Research and activities ==
Kouzarides is Professor of Cancer Biology at the University of Cambridge and a group leader at the Gurdon Institute, a research institution focused on epigenetic modifications and their involvement in cancer. He is Director and co-founder of the Milner Therapeutics Institute, director of Cambridge Gravity and director of STORM Therapeutics.

Kouzarides is founder, patron and ex-director of a cancer charity in Spain called Conquer Cancer (Vencer el Cancer). He is on the Scientific Advisory Board of the Institute of Cancer Research (UK) and on the executive board of the CRUK Cambridge Cancer Centre. He is a co-founder and ex-director of Abcam plc, a publicly trading research reagents company in Cambridge, a co-founder and ex-director of Chroma Therapeutics, of a drug discovery company based in Oxford and a co-founder and current director of STORM Therapeutics, a drug discovery company based in Cambridge.

== Awards and prizes ==
Kouzarides has been elected member of the European Molecular Biology Organization, Fellow of the British Academy of Medical Sciences] (FMedSci), Fellow of the Royal Society (FRS), Fellow of the American Academy of Arts and Sciences (AAAS) and is a Cancer Research UK Gibb Fellow. He has been awarded the Wellcome Trust medal for research in biochemistry related to medicine (UK), the Tenovus Medal (UK), the Bodossaki Foundation prize in Biology (Greece), the Bijvoet Medal (Holland), the Biochemical Society Award Novartis Medal and Prize (UK) and the Heinrich Wieland Prize (Germany).

He was knighted in the 2024 King's Birthday Honours "for services to healthcare innovation and delivery".
