= Portland Press Excellence in Science Award =

Award of the Biochemical Society

The Portland Press Excellence in Science Award was an annual award instituted in 1964 to recognize notable research in any branch of biochemistry undertaken in the UK or Republic of Ireland. It was initially called the CIBA Medal and Prize, then the Novartis Medal and Prize. The prize consists of a medal and a £3000 cash award. The winner is invited to present a lecture at a Society conference and submit an article to one of the Society's publications. Notable recipients include the Nobel laureates John E. Walker, Paul Nurse, Sydney Brenner, César Milstein, Peter D. Mitchell, Rodney Porter, and John Cornforth.

The Novartis Medal and Prize was last presented in 2019 and will be replaced from 2021 by the Portland Press Excellence in Science Award. Portland Press is the publishing arm of the Biochemical Society.

== Recipients ==
Source: Biochemical Society

Portland Press Excellence in Science Award

- 2023: Jordan Raff

Novartis Medal and Prize

- 2021: Bart Vanhaesebroeck
- 2019: Caroline Dean
- 2018: Laurence Pearl
- 2017: Doreen Cantrell
- 2016: David Tollervey
- 2015: Matthew Freeman
- 2014: Jeff Errington
- 2013: Tony Kouzarides
- 2012: Ron Hay
- 2011: Angus Lamond
- 2010: D. Grahame Hardie
- 2009: Louise Johnson
- 2008: Stephen C. West
- 2007: Adrian Bird
- 2006: James Barber
- 2005: Alan Hall
- 2004: Jean D. Beggs
- 2003: Iain D. Campbell
- 2002: Michael S. Neuberger
- 2001: Stephen Halford
- 2000: Kiyoshi Nagai
- 1999: Christopher J. Marshall
- 1998: Richard N. Perham
- 1997: Ronald Laskey
- 1996: John E. Walker
- 1995: Christopher F. Higgins
- 1994: J. Subak-Sharpe
- 1993: T. Rabbitts
- 1992: Philip Cohen
- 1991: Paul Nurse
- 1988: Robert H. Michell
- 1987: Thomas L. Blundell
- 1985: E. A. Barnard
- 1984: Philip J. Randle
- 1983: George K. Radda
- 1981: I. Helen Muir
- 1980: Sydney Brenner
- 1979: J. B. Gurdon
- 1978: J. Rodney Quayle
- 1977: César Milstein
- 1976: Samuel V. Perry
- 1975: E. F. Hartree
- 1974: E. Kodicek
- 1973: Peter D. Mitchell
- 1972: R. T. Williams
- 1971: D. H. Northcote
- 1970: D. C. Phillips
- 1969: Trevor W. Goodwin
- 1968: William J. Whelan
- 1967: D. M. Blow
- 1966: R. R. Porter
- 1965: J. W. Cornforth and G. J. Popjak

== See also ==
- List of biochemistry awards
