= Margaret Stanley (virologist) =

British virologist

Margaret Anne Stanley, OBE FMedSc, is a British virologist and epithelial biologist. She attended the Universities of London, Bristol, and Adelaide. As of 2018, she is an Emeritus Professor of Epithelial Biology in the Department of Pathology at the University of Cambridge and a Fellow of the Academy of Medical Sciences. She is also an Honorary Fellow of the UK Royal College of Obstetricians and Gynaecologists and an honorary fellow of Christ's College, Cambridge. Stanley is a research scientist in virology focusing on the human papillomavirus (HPV). Her research work has led to new scientific findings on HPV. Additionally, she uses her expertise on HPV to serve on multiple advisory committees and journal editorial boards.

== Research ==
Stanley's main research interest is the pathogenesis of HPV, and she currently leads a research group focusing on the prevention and treatment of human papillomavirus infection, which causes cervical cancer.

Early in her research, she generated a non-tumorigenic human cervical keratinocyte cell line, W12, from a low-grade cervical lesion. W12 cells can harbor HPV-16 episomes and thus allow researchers the ability to investigate the complex processes of cervical cancer development. Additionally, she helped to discover the temporal association between high-level chromosomal instability and high-risk human papillomavirus (HR-HPV) integration, a key step in cervical carcinogenesis, such that integration precedes chromosomal abnormalities.

She also studies the host cell responses to infection with the human papillomavirus in immunodeficient individualsimmunodeficient, most commonly HIV-positive immunosuppressant individuals. Evidence from animal models shows that a CD4(+) T cell-dominated Th1 response leads to regression of anogenital warts, an effective cell-mediated immune response (CMI). She states that a failure to produce this effective CMI response to the human papillomavirus facilitates viral persistence, and this can lead to the progression of high-grade disease and invasive cervical cancer.

== Career ==
From 2000 to 2003, she was a member of the Biotechnology and Biological Sciences Research Council (BBSRC). Since then, she has served on multiple UK Research Council committees. She has served on two of the Biotechnology and Biological Sciences Research Council's (BBSRC) major committees and its council for the past ten years. Since 1991, she has been a fellow at Christ's College.

From 2004 to 2010, she served on the Spongiform Encephalopathies Advisory Committee (SEAC). Stanley's involvement in the SEAC was to provide independent scientific data to the UK government on transmissible spongiform encephalopathies (TSEs) and advise the government's public health, food safety, and animal health policies.

In 2017, Stanley was recruited by the American Society of Clinical Oncology to be on a multidisciplinary expert panel that presented new evidence-based recommendations for primary cervical cancer prevention. The number of recommended dosages of the HPV vaccine varies based on resource availability, age, and sex. Stanley endorses the reduction of the recommended HPV vaccine dosage from 3 to 2 for children aged 14 and younger. Additionally, she states that there is preliminary evidence for the effectiveness of just one dosage of the HPV vaccine, and further research needs to be conducted.

Currently, Stanley serves as an expert on HPV for the HPV subcommittee of the UK's Joint Committee on Vaccines and Immunization. She also serves on the editorial board for the following scientific journals: Sexually Transmitted Infections, Journal of Clinical Virology, and Reviews in Medical Virology. Stanley is also working as a consultant for companies that market HPV vaccines. Some of these companies include GSK, MSD, and Sanofi Pasteur MSD. ^{She also works with small biotech firms that are creating therapeutic vaccines. She serves as the Joint Committee on Vaccines and Immunization in the UK's HPV subcommittee's invited HPV expert.}

== Advocacy ==
Stanley is a vocal advocate of HPV vaccination pre-puberty, specifically between the ages of 13 and early 20s. Stanley acknowledges that the recommended HPV vaccines have been shown to generate high enough concentrations of antibodies to fight the virus. Stanley also urges that both sexes be vaccinated because both are susceptible to HPV-related illnesses. She endorses both licensed HPV L1 VLP vaccines, the bivalent vaccine for HPV types 16 and 18 (Cervarix) and the quadrivalent vaccine for HPV types 6, 11, 16, and 18 (Gardasil). Stanley states that both licensed HPV vaccines are safe and highly immunogenic.

Stanley is currently the Vice President of the International Papillomavirus Society (IPVS) and a member of the IPVS's Executive, Policy, and Strategy and Planning Committees. Her main work with the IPVS is encouraging nations to endorse and utilize the readily available and effective HPV vaccinations to help prevent and treat HIV infection in young people.

== Awards and honors ==
In 2004, Stanley was awarded an OBE for services to virology. In 2010, she was given the Lifetime Achievement Award by the American Society for Colposcopy and Cervical Pathology (ASCCP) for her contributions to cervical cancer and cervical precancers research. She also holds a lifetime award for achievement from the International Papillomavirus Society. In 2023, Stanley received the Maurice Hilleman Award from the International Papillomavirus Society.

== Key papers ==
- Stanley, MA; Sterling, JC (2014). "Host responses to infection with human papillomavirus". Curr Probl Dermatol. Current Problems in Dermatology. 45: 58–74. doi:10.1159/000355964. ISBN 978-3-318-02526-2. PMID 24643178.
- Hanning, JE; Saini, HK; Murray, MJ; Caffarel, MM; van Dongen, S; Ward, D; Barker, EM; Scarpini, CG; Groves, IJ; Stanley, MA; Enright, AJ; Pett, MR; Coleman, N (2013). "Depletion of HPV16 early genes induces autophagy and senescence in a cervical carcinogenesis model, regardless of viral physical state". J Pathol. 231 (3): 354–66. doi:10.1002/path.4244. PMID 23913724.
- Stanley, MA (2012). "Epithelial cell responses to infection with human papillomavirus". Clin Microbiol Rev. 25 (2): 215–22. doi:10.1128/cmr.05028-11. PMC 3346303. PMID 22491770.
- Stanley, MA (2012). "Genital human papillomavirus infections: current and prospective therapies". J Gen Virol. 93 (4): 681–91. doi:10.1099/vir.0.039677-0. PMID 22323530.
- Crawford, R; Grignon, AL; Kitson, S; Winder, DM; Ball, SL; Vaughan, K; Stanley, MA; Sterling, JC; Goon, PK (2011). "High prevalence of HPV in non-cervical sites of women with abnormal cervical cytology". BMC Cancer. 11: 473. doi:10.1186/1471-2407-11-473. PMC 3218103. PMID 22047498.
- Ball, SL; Winder, DM; Vaughan, K; Hanna, N; Levy, J; Sterling, JC; Stanley, MA; Goon, PK (2011). "Analyses of human papillomavirus genotypes and viral loads in anogenital warts" (PDF). J Med Virol. 83 (8): 1345–1350. doi:10.1002/jmv.22111. PMID 21678438. S2CID 206117475.
- Sudhoff, HH; Schwarze, HP; Winder, D; Steinstraesser, L; Görner, M; Stanley, M; Goon, PK (2011). "Evidence for a causal association for HPV in head and neck cancers". Eur Arch Otorhinolaryngol. 268 (11): 1541–7. doi:10.1007/s00405-011-1714-8. PMID 21792686. S2CID 13008445.
- Pett, MR; Alazawi, W (2004). "O.F., Roberts I, Dowen S, Smith DI, Stanley MA, and Coleman N. (2004) Acquisition of High-Level Chromosomal Instability Is Associated with Integration of Human Papillomavirus Type 16 in Cervical Keratinocytes". Cancer Research. 64 (4): 1359–1368. doi:10.1158/0008-5472.can-03-3214. PMID 14973079.
- Nicholls, PK; Moore, PF; Anderson, DM; Moore, RA; Parry, NR; Gough, GW; Stanley, MA (2001). "Regression of canine oral papillomas is associated with infiltration of CD4+ and CD8+ lymphocytes". Virology. 283 (1): 31–39. doi:10.1006/viro.2000.0789. PMID 11312659.
- Coleman, N; Birley, HD; Renton, AM; Hanna, NF; Ryait, BK; Byrne, M; Taylor-Robinson, D; Stanley, MA (1994). "Immunological events in regressing genital warts". Am J Clin Pathol. 102 (6): 768–774. doi:10.1093/ajcp/102.6.768. PMID 7801889.
- Stanley, MA; Browne, HM; Appleby, M; Minson, AC (1989). "Properties of a non-tumorigenic human cervical keratinocyte cell line". Int J Cancer. 43 (4): 672–676. doi:10.1002/ijc.2910430422. PMID 2467886. S2CID 25064033.
