= J. Rodney Quayle =

British microbial biochemist and academic

John Rodney (Rod) Quayle FRS
- Born: 1926
- Died: 2006 (aged 79–80)
- Spouse: Yvonne Sanderson
- Children: 2
- Awards: Fellow of the Royal Society
- Scientific career
- Theses: The reactions of S‑triphenylbenzene and derivatives with special reference to steric hindrance (1949); Colouring matters of the Aphididae (1952)
- Doctoral advisors: Edward D. Hughes; Alexander R. Todd

John Rodney (Rod) Quayle FRS (1926–2006) was a microbial biochemist, West Riding Professor of Microbiology and Head of Department at University of Sheffield (1965–1983) and then Vice-Chancellor of Bath University (1983–1992). He adopted techniques for dissecting enzymic reactions using radioactive carbon-14. He focused on microbes that used compounds containing one atom of carbon as their sources of energy and biomass.

== Personal life and education ==
Quayle was born in Hoylake, Flintshire. When he was around 5, his father left the family and Quayle moved with his mother and older brother to Cilcain to live with his maternal grandparents, who supported the children financially. He attended Alun Grammar School in Mold.

In 1943 he was award a County Scholarship for university study and he then studied for a B.Sc. degree in chemistry at University College of North Wales, Bangor that was awarded in 1946. He then studied physical organic chemistry for his doctoral degree supervised by Edward D. Hughes. He then moved to University of Cambridge and worked with Alexander R. Todd on the blood pigment molecules of the Aphididae insects. This led to the award of a second PhD degree in 1952.

In 1951 he and Yvonne Sanderson were married. They had two children, a son and a daughter.

He died 26 February 2006.

== Career ==
Following his research at Cambridge, in 1953 Quayle moved to University of California, Berkeley, USA and worked with Melvin Calvin on understanding the biosynthesis of sugars in plants for two years. This involved the use of radioactive isotopes of carbon dioxide in rapid biochemical reactions, and he learnt the analytical techniques to identify the reaction products. In 1955 he returned to the UK to a post at the UK government's Tropical Products Institute to work on pyrethrin insecticides.

However, he sought a post with more biochemical, rather than chemical, opportunity and through a chance meeting ended up collaborating with Hans Kornberg to characterise both the glyoxylate cycle and the glycerate pathway at the MRC Unit for Research in Cell Metabolism at Oxford University that was directed by Hans Krebs. Quayle now changed the direction of his research to use the techniques he had learnt in the US to understand methylotrophic bacteria that make use of one carbon compounds as sources of energy and biomass. At the time, there was relatively little known about the biochemistry of this nutritional strategy. This was very fruitful and the area was the focus of his subsequent research. He was appointed as a lecturer in biochemistry at Oriel College, University of Oxford in 1957, and then in 1963 he was invited to accept a senior lectureship in biochemistry at University of Sheffield, and then promoted to the West Riding Professorship of Microbiology in 1965.

His research group made use of radioactive labelling as well as isolation of enzymes and a range of analytical methods to identify the products of the enzyme reactions. Through this combined approach, they defined the biochemical pathways available to the bacterial methylotrophs for use of a range of one-carbon compounds, including methane, methanol, formaldehyde and carbon dioxide. As a result, they characterised the four variants on the ribulose monophosphate pathway (RuMP pathway) and key parts of the serine cycle. From 1970 the group used the same approach to discover that single celled fungi utilised methanol using a further variation that they termed the dihydroxyacetone cycle.

From 1967 Quayle advised the ICI company during the development of the Pruteen project that initially aimed to use methane to grow bacteria for use as animal feed. His suggestion that methanol would be a preferable feed-stock was important in development of the technology, as was his further advice.

Quayle held several academic administrative posts. From 1974 until 1976 he was Dean of the Faculty of Science at University of Sheffield. From 1983 until 1992 Quayle was Vice-Chancellor of University of Bath. His personal experience with applications of science to industry supported the development of applied science as well as research at Bath. He was a member of the UK National Committee for Microbiology from 1985 until 1990, that provided advice to the UK government.

He retired in 1992.

== Publications ==
Quayle was the author or co-author of 107 scientific publications. Some of the most significant are:

- Quayle, J. R., Fuller, R. C., Benson, A. A. and Calvin, M. (1954) Enzymatic carboxylation of ribulose diphosphate. J. Am. Chem. Soc. 76 3610–3611
- J. R. Quayle (1980) Microbial assimilation of C-1 compounds. Biochemical Society Transactions 8 (1) 1 - 10

== Awards ==
In 1978 Quayle was elected to the Royal Society and was also awarded the CIBA Medal and Prize of the Biochemical Society. He was awarded an honorary doctorate from the University of Göttingen in 1989, and from the Universities of Bath and Sheffield in 1992. He also served as president of the Society for General Microbiology from 1990 to 1993. He was awarded an Honorary Fellowship by Bangor University in 1996.
