= Bart Vanhaesebroeck =

Belgian-British biomedical scientist

- Born: Belgium
- Education: University of Ghent
- Known for: Research on phosphoinositide 3-kinases (PI3Ks)
- Awards: Fellow of the Royal Society (FRS) (2024); Portland Press Excellence in Science Award (2021); Fellow of the Royal Society of Biology (2011); Fellow of the Academy of Medical Sciences (2011); EMBO Membership (2008)
- Scientific career
- Fields: Biomedical science, Cell signalling, Cancer, Immunology, Drug development
- Workplaces: University College London, Ludwig Institute for Cancer Research, Queen Mary University of London
- Doctoral advisor: Johan Grooten, Walter Fiers

Bart Vanhaesebroeck FRS is a Belgian-British biomedical scientist and Professor of Cell Signalling at the UCL Cancer Institute, University College London. He is known for his research on phosphoinositide 3-kinases (PI3Ks) and their role in cell signalling, immunology, and cancer.

== Education and career ==
Vanhaesebroeck received a licentiate degree in Biology in 1985 and a PhD in 1990, both from the University of Ghent. He conducted his PhD studies at the Laboratory of Molecular Biology under the supervision of Johan Grooten and Walter Fiers, focusing on the biology of the newly-cloned cytokines interleukin-2 (IL2) and tumour necrosis factor (TNF).

He completed postdoctoral research with Michael Waterfield at the Ludwig Institute for Cancer Research in London. In 1998, he established his own research group at the institute and joined University College London (UCL), where he became Professor in 2005. He also became an Associate Member of the Ludwig Institute in 2006.

In 2007, Vanhaesebroeck moved to Barts Cancer Institute at Queen Mary University of London, where he founded the Centre for Cell Signalling.

He returned to UCL in 2014 to join the UCL Cancer Institute as Professor of Cell Signalling.

== Research ==
Vanhaesebroeck has made fundamental contributions to the understanding of cell signalling and how this knowledge can be exploited therapeutically by either inhibiting or activating signalling pathways.

His work focuses on lipid second messengers, particularly the PI3K family. His research has contributed to the understanding of how different PI3K isoforms function and how they regulate immune responses and cancer progression. To enable these studies, he developed novel genetic approaches to accurately model kinase inhibition in model organisms.

In 1997, Vanhaesebroeck and collaborators identified the p110δ isoform of PI3K (PI3Kδ), which is primarily expressed in white blood cells. His group later demonstrated its critical role in regulating B and T cell function. He and his colleagues later discovered that inactivation of PI3Kδ paradoxically activates the immune system, which is now the basis for its exploration in cancer immunotherapy for solid tumours.

These findings contributed to the development of PI3Kδ inhibitors, some of which have been approved for the treatment of hematological malignancies and the activated PI3Kδ syndrome (APDS), and are under investigation for use in cancer immunotherapy.

Vanhaesebroeck's laboratory has also made major contributions to understanding the roles of the PI3Kα isoform in metabolism and insulin signalling, vascular biology, and vascular anomalies, which helped lead to the clinical approval of a PI3Kα inhibitor in the PI3K-driven overgrowth syndrome.

His group has also developed small-molecule PI3K activators, expanding potential therapeutic approaches for diseases involving kinase dysregulation.

== Honours ==
- Elected Member of the European Molecular Biology Organization (2008)
- Elected Fellow of the Academy of Medical Sciences (2011)
- Elected Fellow of the Royal Society of Biology (2011)
- Excellence in Science Award, Biochemical Society (2021)
- Elected Fellow of the Royal Society (2024)
- Honorary Citizen (Ereburger), Stad Deinze (2024)
