= Honda knot =

Knot

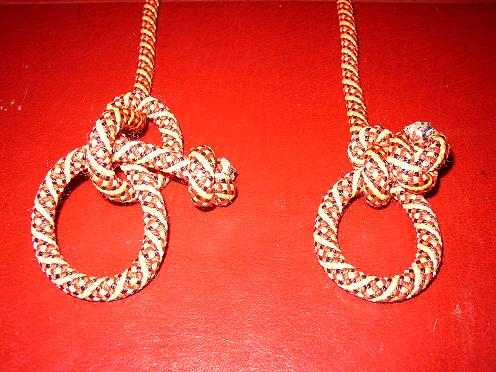
- Names: Honda knot, Lariat loop, Bowstring knot
- Category: Loop
- Releasing: Non-jamming
- Typical use: Lassos, stringing bows
- ABoK: #227, #1024, #1127, #151

A honda knot is the loop knot commonly used in a lasso. Its round shape, especially when tied in stiff rope, helps it slide freely along the rope it is tied around. To tie, first place an overhand knot in the end of the rope. Then tie a second overhand knot, pass the running end of the rope through it, and tighten.

A lariat loop is similarly constructed but will not slip from the running end. To tie a lariat loop: first tie an overhand knot, then pinch it so that the running end slides freely back and forth. Pass the rope end through just that "free-sliding" loop, and tighten. The photograph at right displays a lariat loop, with an additional overhand knot acting as a stopper knot because the lariat loop can slip by way of the rope's end when tension is not applied to the running end. It can be quickly adjusted, but does not function exactly the same as a lasso knot, which makes it perhaps safer.

== See also ==
- List of knots
