= Cinematic rendering =

Medical diagnostic tool

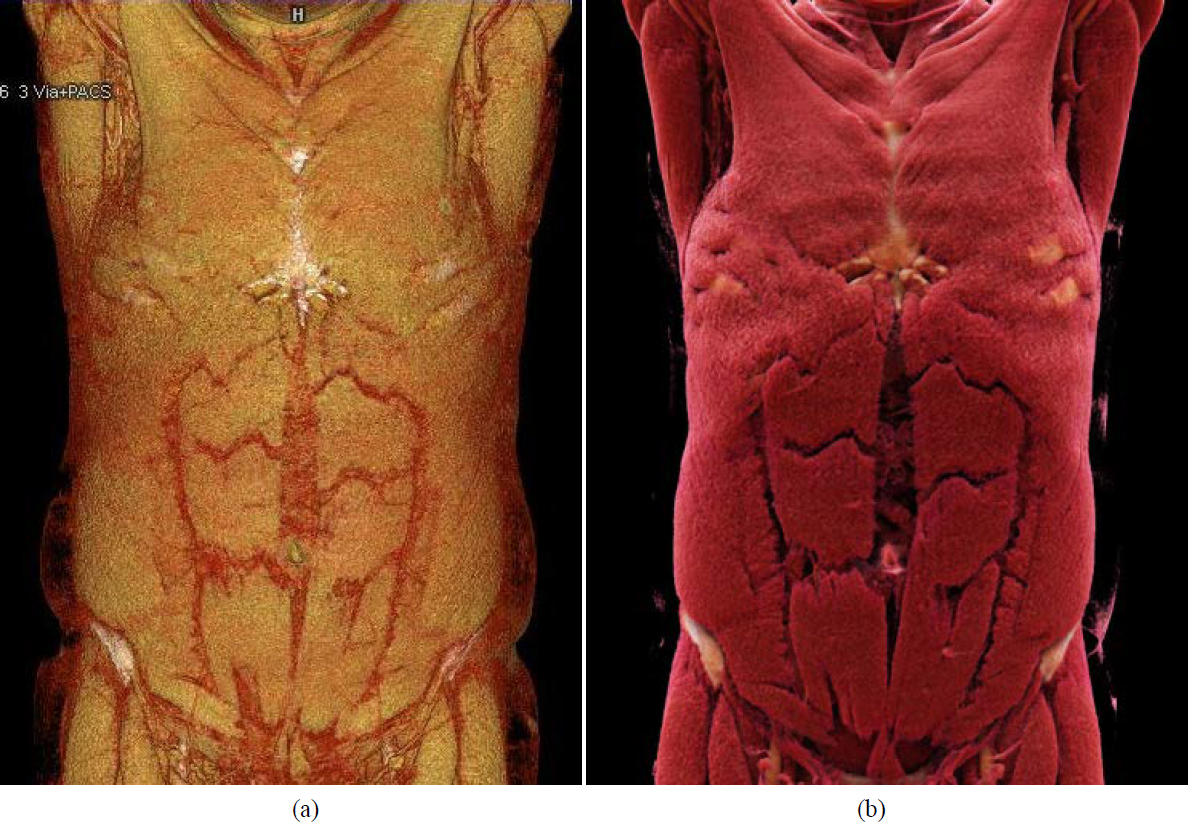
Comparison of whole-body CT scan visualizations: volume rendering is on the left, cinematic rendering on the right

In medical diagnostics, cinematic rendering is an image processing technique applied to create three-dimensional, photorealistic images of cross-sectional data, such as computed-tomography, or magnetic resonance imaging (MRI)/ Cinematic rendering is an alternative to the volume rendering, the name was inspired by the modern computer animation techniques that allow studios, like Pixar, to create realistically looking objects.

The steps used to produce the cinematic rendering are similar to the ones for the volume rendering:

- the magnitude (gray) value of each voxel (3-dimensional pixel) produced during the scan is mapped into the color and opacity pair based on what structures need to be highlighted or hidden;
- ray casting used for volume rendering, where each pixel in the 2D image is formed by a single ray of light, is replaced by path tracing with a global illumination model that integrates over all the illuminance arriving to every single point on the surface of an object.

Since the number of light paths in this technique is nearly unlimited, a finite randomized selection of the paths and importance sampling are used to imitate the real-life propagation of light, scattering, and reflection using models build on real-life data. The result is a photorealistic image.

== Applications in medical education ==
Cinematic rendering is not approved for the clinical use.

Cinematic rendering technology is currently applied as a virtual educational method at specialized facilities, institutions, and centers to teach the subject of anatomy to both medical students and other healthcare professions, for example, at the JKU Faculty of Medicine at the Johannes Kepler University Linz, and for post-graduate programs in clinical areas as well as medical assistant professions.

== Surgical applications ==
A 2026 review described cinematic rendering in CT angiography as useful for visualizing complex vascular anatomy and identified preoperative planning as a potential application area. In a 2019 preclinical randomized crossover study in hepatopancreatobiliary surgery, surgeons using cinematic rendering answered anatomy questions more correctly and more quickly than with conventional CT.

== See also ==
- German Future Prize 2017 – Team 1
