= VoluMedic =

VoluMedic is a computer-generated imaging software tool that creates 3D images of sites within the body. It offers software volume rendering as well as hardware volume rendering (for interactive previews) of volumetric datasets.

VoluMedic is capable of importing images or series of images as well as volume datasets in DICOM, EZRT, RAW, Analyze and many other formats (TIFF, TGA, JPEG, HDRI, etc.). These are then turned into volumetric objects using the companies own software volume renderer which integrates into LightWave3d as a volumetric class plugin. This means that volumetric objects can be rendered together with polygon based geometry which is handled by LightWave's own renderer. VoluMedic's volumetric objects can receive lights from all of LightWave's light- types and can cast raytraced shadows on geometry or receive shadows from geometry and from other volumetric objects. Self-shadowing is also supported if VoluMedic is used with LightWave version 9.0 or later. Volumetric objects rendered with VoluMedics software renderer also appear in reflections.

The software's intended uses are for medical visualization, material science, forensic animation and visual effects. Among others, VoluMedic is currently used by Zoic Studios for the visual effects of CSI: Crime Scene Investigation.

== Gallery ==
VoluMedic software rendering of a CT- angiogram in a patient with abdominal aortic aneurysm.

== See also ==
- Volume rendering
- Medical imaging
- Digital Imaging and Communications in Medicine
