= Bitplane =

- Company type: Public
- Founded: 1992
- Headquarters: Belfast, United Kingdom
- Products: Imaris: Software for 3D and 4D Imaging
- Parent: Andor Technology
- Website: www.bitplane.com

Bitplane is a provider of software for 3D and 4D image analysis for the life sciences. Founded in December 1992, Bitplane operates out of three offices in Zürich, Switzerland, Belfast, United Kingdom, and South Windsor, Connecticut, United States.

== Company history ==
As confocal microscopes were first becoming commercially available, the founders of Bitplane, Marius Messerli, Karl-Hermann Fuchs, and Jürgen Holm, realised that there was no suitable way to visualize and analyze the images provided by this more modern equipment. While pursuing their research at the Institute for cell Biology at the ETH in Zurich the first productive version of Bitplane's core product, Imaris, was developed. A small community of users developed among the scientific collaborators of the founders and the company Bitplane was created.

The name Imaris derives from three words: "image" analysis, the primary function of the software, "Marius" the name of the innovator and Bitplane co-founder, and finally, the "Personal Iris", the name of the hardware that initially enabled interactive 3D imaging.

When Imaris was introduced to the market in 1993 it ran only on Silicon Graphics (SGI) workstations as at the time only these were capable to perform 3D volume rendering at a speed worthy of being deemed "interactive". With the appearance of OpenGL capable graphics boards in personal computers the company decided to port its software to Windows and Macintosh and released a first version for the personal computer in 2001.

By the end of 1994, the software had sold in 30 labs in central Europe. In 1998, the product was introduced to the US market.

From 1994 to 1997, in co-operation with the Maurice E. Muller foundation in Bern, Switzerland, Bitplane launched a second line of software products for the documentation and management of medical information for orthopedic surgeons. In 1997, this part of Bitplane's activity was made independent. Headed by Dr. Holm, this software line operates under the name of Qualidoc AG, Switzerland, and is a vendor of hospital information management systems.

Bitplane was acquired by Andor Technology in December 2009.

== Market history ==
Bitplane raised venture capital in 2000 to accelerate its growth. After an investment with Endeavour (), Bitplane started to grow its presence in North America and built a new technology foundation for the software.

After having weathered a slowing in demand caused by the burst of the internet bubble in 2001, Bitplane steadily grew in sales, market share, and profitability.

The development of Imaris is tightly linked to the development of the confocal microscope. The first publication of a confocal microscope appeared in 1957 when Marvin Minsky patented his microscope (Minsky 1957). The instrument did not find much attention in the scientific community at the time due to the lack of light collection efficiency. It was only at the end of the 1970s, with the generation of scanning confocal microscopes, that the technique became useful for biological studies (Brakenhoff, 1979 and Choudhury 1977).

In order to explore the 3D capabilities of the confocal microscope, the instrument still had to be combined with high-end graphics computers. The first combination of a confocal microscope with specialized computer hardware that enabled digital image processing was presented by Van der Voort et al. (1985). In the late 1980s, Biorad introduced the first commercial laser scanning confocal microscope to the market, followed by Carl Zeiss and Leica soon after. All of these instruments delivered quality 3D images, however, there was no software to properly visualize and analyze the content. The development of Imaris started in 1989, to fulfill the needs of biologists to take full advantage of these high-quality images.

== Products ==
=== Imaris ===
Imaris is Bitplane's core product which provides functionality for the visualization, segmentation and interpretation of 3D and 4D microscopy datasets. Imaris allows visualization of original and derived data objects in a real time interactive manner so one can quickly make visual assessments of one's experiments in 3D and 4D to discover relationships that are otherwise hidden. With a large variety of segmentation options, Imaris provides the user with tools to segment large datasets to identify, separate, and visualize individual objects.
