= ClearVolume =

ClearVolume is an open source real-time live 3D visualization library designed for high-end volumetric light sheet microscopes. ClearVolume enables the live visualization of microscope data - allowing the biologists to immediately decide whether a sample is worth imaging. ClearVolume can easily be integrated into existing Java, C/C++, Python, or LabVIEW based microscope software. It has a dedicated interface to MicroManager/OpenSpim/OpenSpin control software. ClearVolume supports multi-channels, live 3D data streaming from remote microscopes, and uses a multi-pass Fibonacci rendering algorithm that can handle large volumes. Moreover, ClearVolume is integrated into the FiJi/ImageJ2/KNIME ecosystem.

== See also ==
- FiJi
- KNIME
- Light sheet fluorescence microscopy
- Volume rendering
