= Studierfenster =

StudierFenster
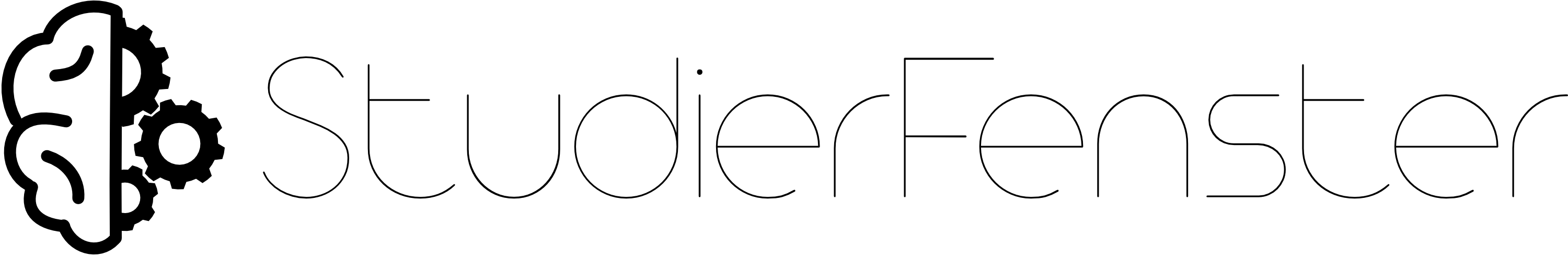
- The Studierfenster Logo
- Developers: University Hospital Essen, Graz University of Technology, Medical University of Graz
- Release: 2018; 8 years ago
- Written in: C, C++, Python, JavaScript, HTML
- Operating system: Cross-platform (Windows, Mac OS X, Linux)
- Available in: English
- Type: Image processing, scientific visualization, medical imaging, volume rendering, Interactive visualization
- License: GPL, CC BY-SA
- Website: studierfenster.icg.tugraz.at

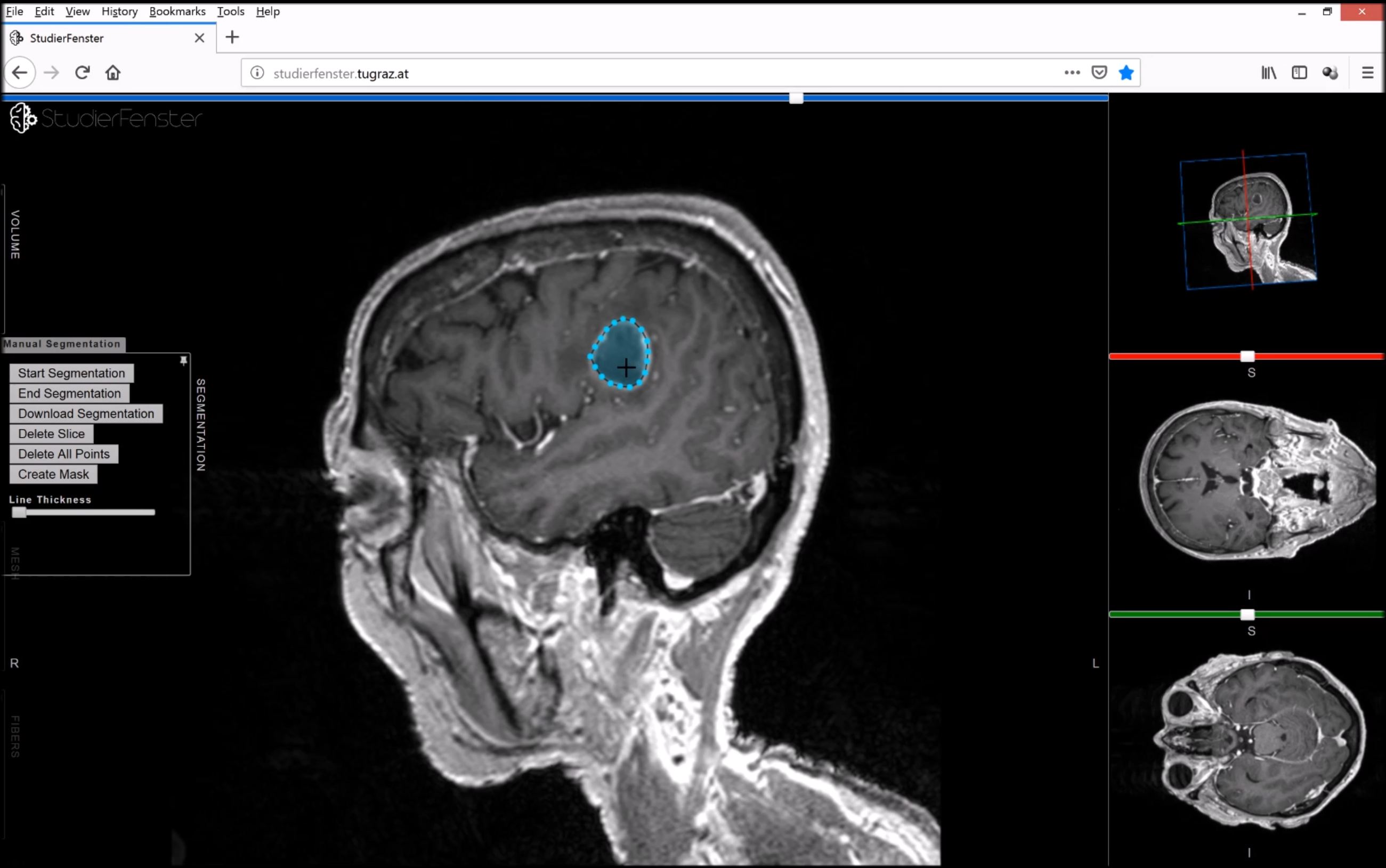
Brain Tumor Segmentation under Studierfenster.

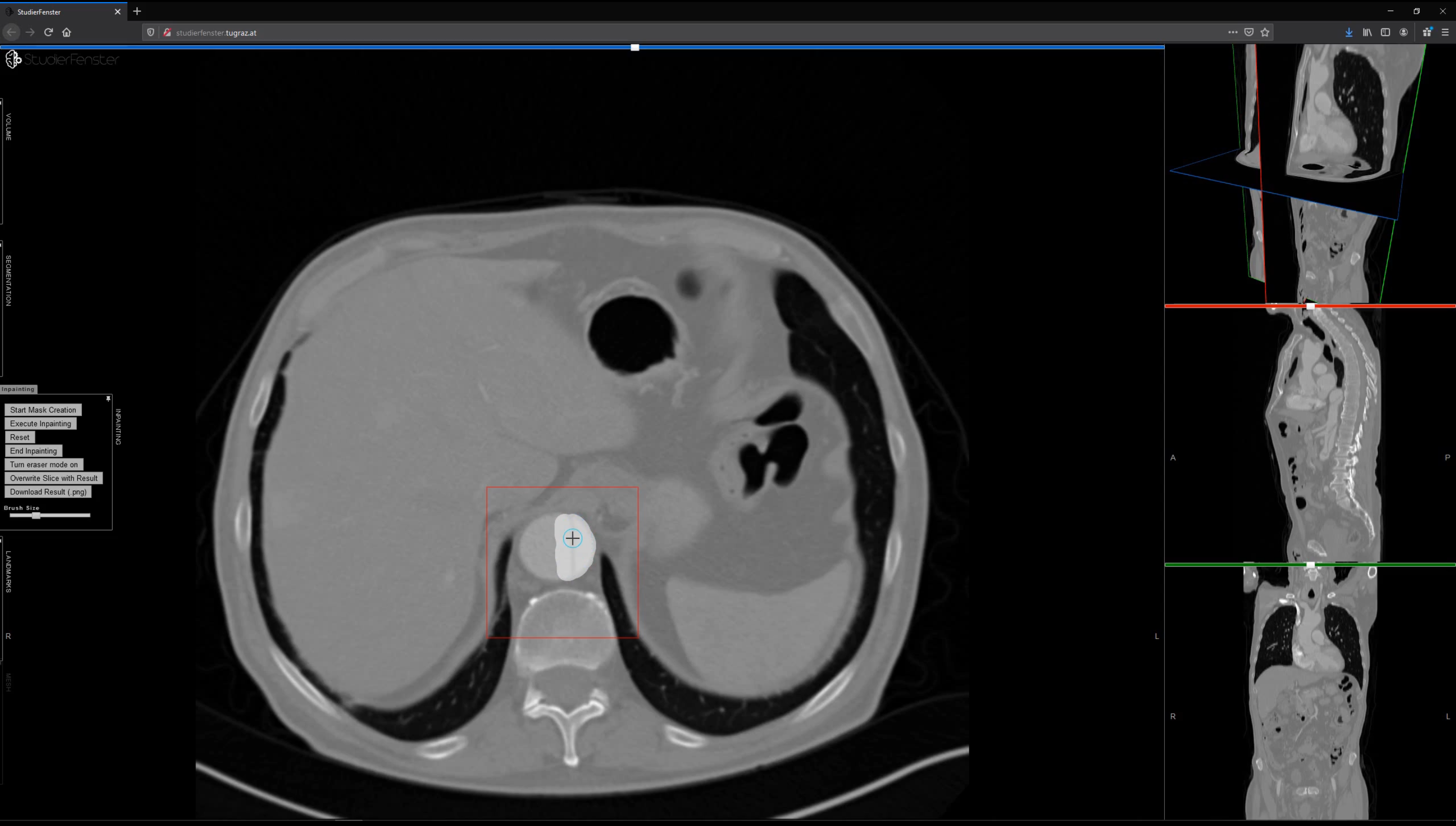
Aortic Dissection (AD) Inpainting under Studierfenster.

Studierfenster or StudierFenster (SF) is a free, non-commercial open science client/server-based medical imaging processing online framework. It offers capabilities, like viewing medical data (computed tomography (CT), magnetic resonance imaging (MRI), etc.) in two- and three-dimensional space directly in the standard web browsers, like Google Chrome, Mozilla Firefox, Safari, and Microsoft Edge. Other functionalities are the calculation of medical metrics (dice score and Hausdorff distance), manual slice-by-slice outlining of structures in medical images (segmentation), manual placing of (anatomical) landmarks in medical image data, viewing medical data in virtual reality, a facial reconstruction and registration of medical data for augmented reality, one click showcases for COVID-19 and veterinary scans, and a Radiomics module.

Other features of Studierfenster are the automatic cranial implant design with a neural network, the inpainting of aortic dissections with a generative adversarial network, an automatic aortic landmark detection with deep learning in computed tomography angiography scans, and a GrowCut algorithm implementation for image segmentation.

Studierfenster is currently hosted on a server at the Graz University of Technology in Austria, and expanded jointly with the Institute for Artificial Intelligence in Medicine (IKIM) in Essen, Germany.

== History ==
Studierfenster was initiated within two bachelor theses during the summer bachelor program of the Institute of Computer Graphics and Vision (ICG) at Graz University of Technology, Austria, in cooperation with the Medical University of Graz, Austria, in 2018/2019.

The name Studierfenster (or StudierFenster) is German and can be translated to 'StudyWindow', whereby window refers here to a browser window. The word Studierfenster is an adaption from the word Studierstube ('study room'), which was an augmented reality project at the Vienna University of Technology in Austria.

== Architecture ==
The Studierfenster Architecture.

Studierfenster is set up as a distributed application via a client–server model. The client side (front-end) consists of HTML and JavaScript with WebGL to enable 2D and 3D visualization, rendered on the client.

The server side (back-end) handles client requests via C, C++ and Python. It interfaces to common open source libraries and software tools like the Insight Toolkit, the Visualization Toolkit (VTK), the X Toolkit (XTK) and Slice:Drop. The server communication is handled by AJAX requests were needed.

Studierfenster employs a Flask server.

== Features ==
=== Dicom browser ===
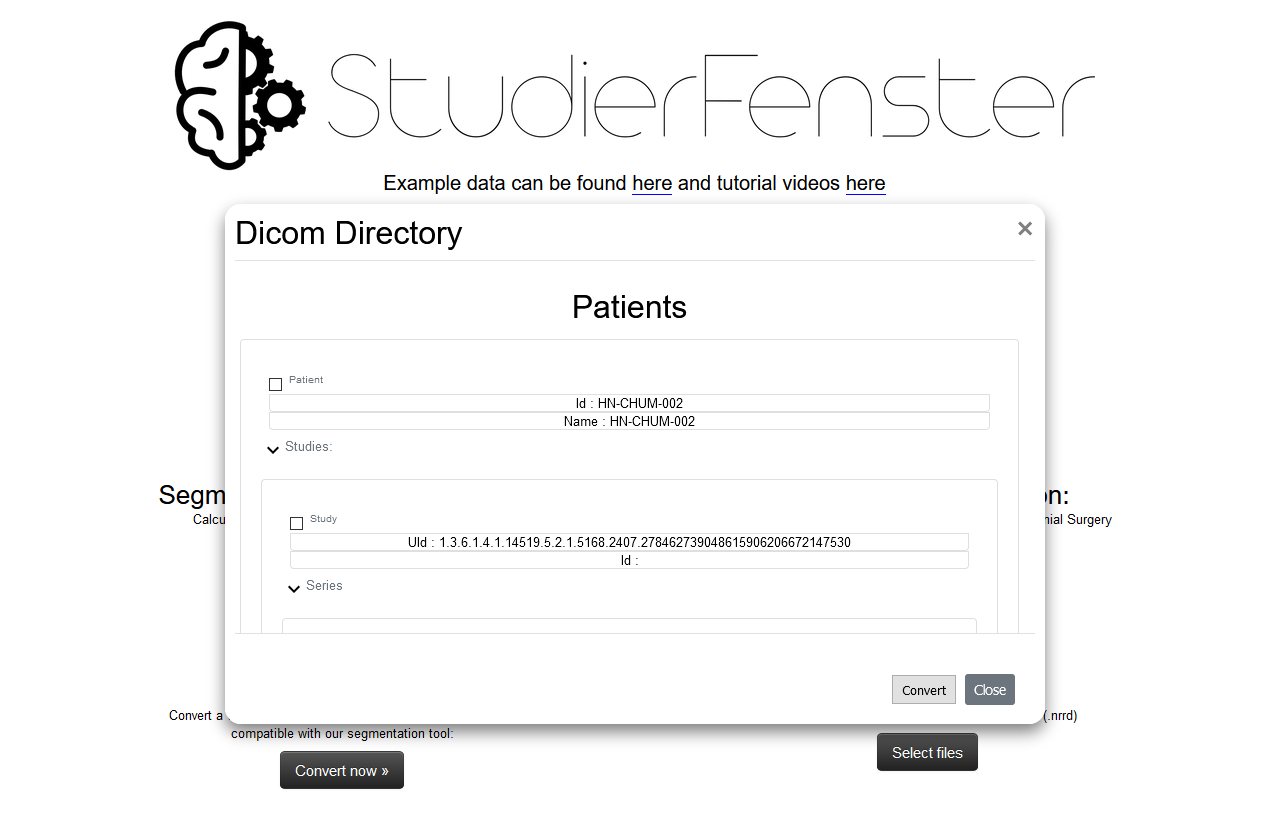
The Studierfenster DICOM Browser

This allows client-side parsing a local folder with DICOM (Digital Imaging and Communications in Medicine) files. Afterwards, the whole folder can be converted to compressed .nrrd (nearly raw raster data) files and downloaded as a single .zip file.

Nrrd is a library and file format for the representation and processing of n-dimensional raster data. It is intended to support scientific visualization and (medical) image processing applications. With the "Dicom Browser" of Studierfenster, it is possible to select specific Studies or Series, and only convert these.

=== File converter ===
The file converter converts a medical volume file (e.g. a non-compressed .nrrd file) to a compressed/binary .nrrd file. After the conversion, the compressed .nrrd file can be downloaded and used with the "Medical 3D Viewer" for 2D and 3D visualization, and further image processing.

=== Metrics module ===
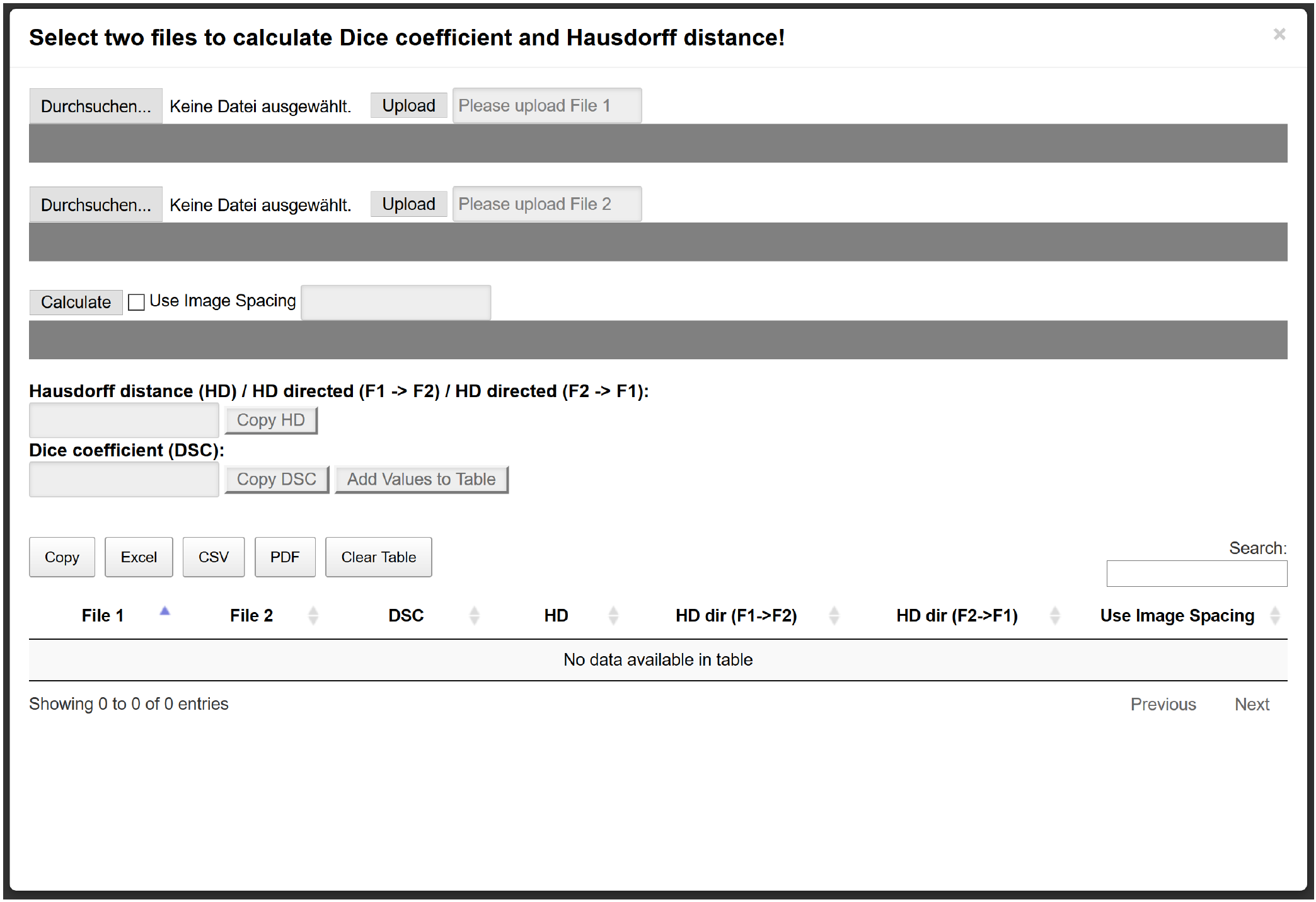
The Studierfenster Metrics Module

This can calculate the Dice similarity coefficient and Hausdorff distance between two segmentation masks (in .nrrd format) in a standard web browser.

The resulting table has seven columns: the file names for both files used in the calculation, the calculated Dice similarity coefficient, the calculated Hausdorff distance, the calculated directed HD for both directions, and the information if image spacing was used in the calculation. The table can be sorted, is searchable, and can be exported as a simple copy, an Excel spreadsheet, a comma-separated values file or as a portable document format.

The Metrics Module has been used to compare manual anatomical segmentations of brain tumors

=== VR viewer ===
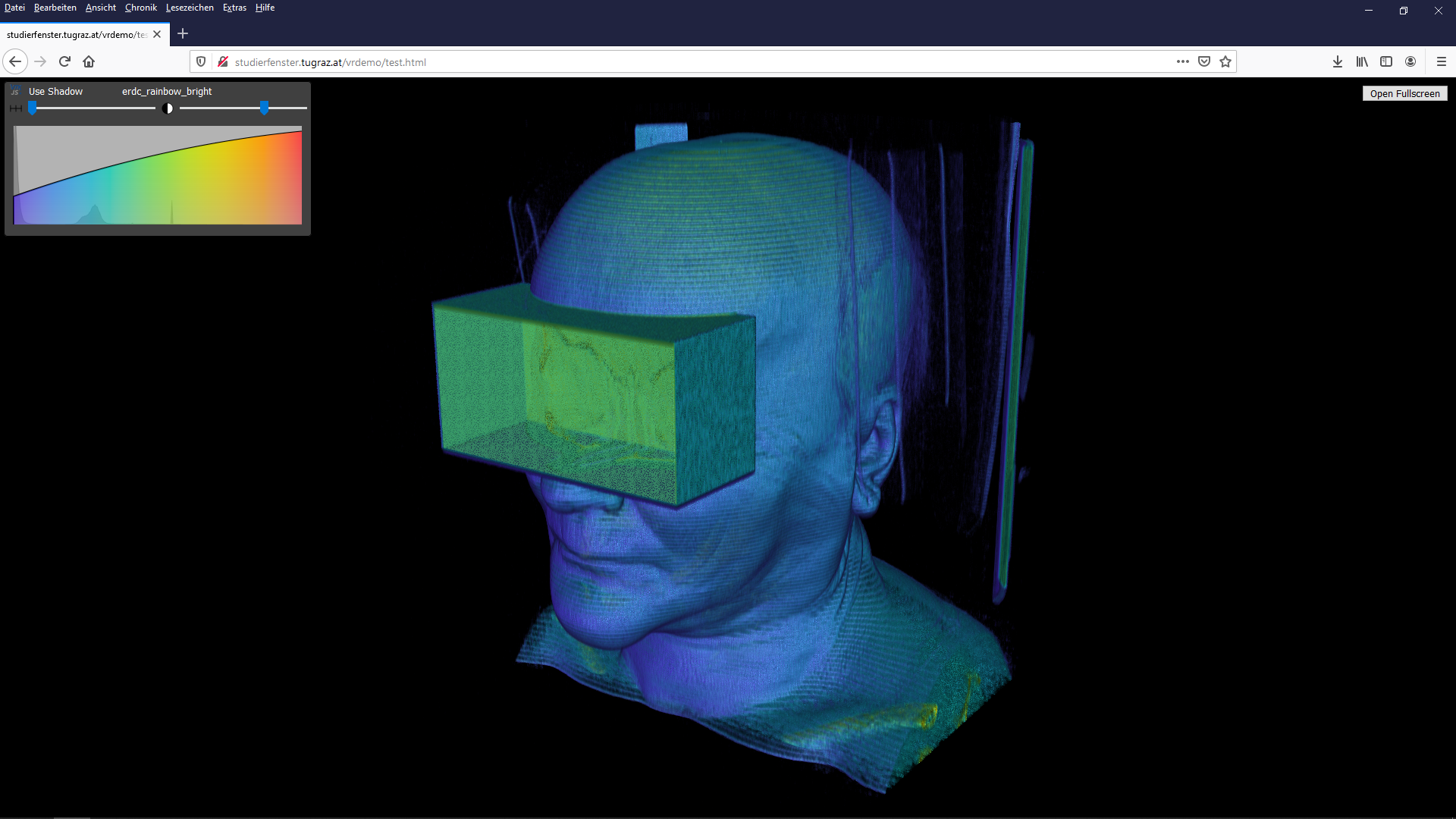
Virtual Reality under Studierfenster.

The VR Viewer (or Medical VR Viewer) enables viewing (medical) data in Virtual Reality (VR) with devices like the Google Cardboard or the HTC Vive (via the WebVR App). For viewing the data in VR, it needs to be converted to the VTI (.vti) format, which can be done with open-source, multi-platform data analysis and visualization application ParaView

== Critics ==
Studierfenster is not a certified medical product; it can only be used for educational, research, and informational purposes.
