= Andor Technology =

Developer and manufacturer of high performance light measuring solutions

Andor Technology Ltd
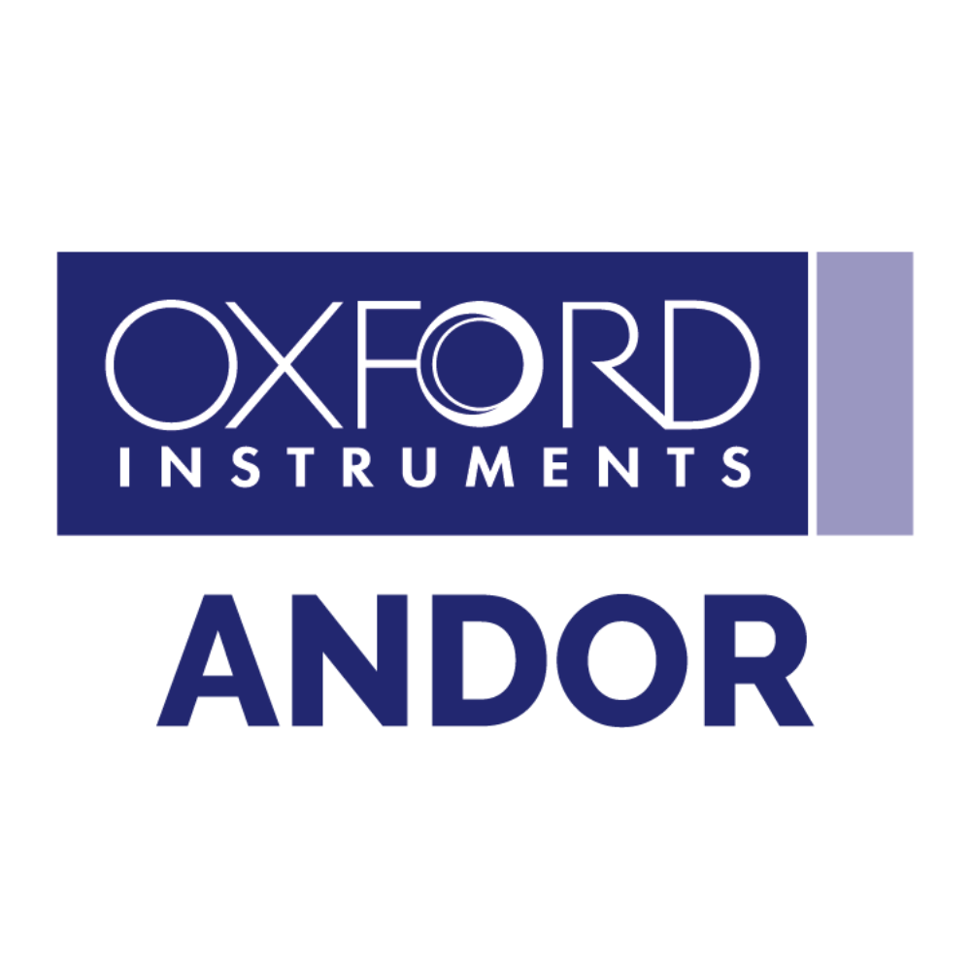
- Company type: Subsidiary
- Industry: Scientific Imaging Equipment
- Founded: 1989
- Founders: Hugh Cormican, Donal Denvir and Mike Pringle
- Headquarters: Belfast, Northern Ireland
- Products: scientific cameras, microscopy systems, spectrographs, software, accessories and hardware, OEM and Custom Solutions
- Number of employees: 400
- Parent: Oxford Instruments
- Website: andor.oxinst.com

Andor Technology Ltd is a global developer and manufacturer of scientific cameras, microscopy systems and spectrographs for academic, government, and industrial applications. Founded in 1989, the company's products play a central role in the advancement of research in the fields of life sciences, physical sciences, and industrial applications. Andor was purchased for £176 million in December 2013 by Oxford Instruments. The company is based in Belfast, Northern Ireland and now employs over 400 staff across the group at its offices in Belfast, Japan, China, Switzerland and the US.

Andor designs, manufactures, and sells scientific imaging equipment, including charge-coupled device (CCD), electron-multiplying CCD (EMCCD), scientific CMOS (sCMOS - an improved Active pixel sensor), and intensified charge-coupled device camera systems, spectroscopy instrumentation, laser-based and laser-free microscopy systems and software.

== History ==
Andor was set up by its founders, Dr. Hugh Cormican, Dr. Donal Denvir, and Mr. Mike Pringle in 1989. While studying at Queen's University Belfast, they "used their physics know-how to build a highly sensitive digital camera...as a tool for their laser research." They subsequently set up Andor to develop it into a commercial product for use in scientific research.

In 2001, Andor introduced its first EMCCD camera, the DV 465, and the company was awarded The Photonics Circle of Excellence Awards from Laurin Publishing, which recognizes the 25 Most Technically Innovative New Products of the Year. EMCCD cameras are based on CCD chips that incorporate electron multiplication, or EMCCD technology. They are used in fields such as drug discovery, where scientists need to watch vats of chemicals in real-time, astrophysics, and oceanography.

In December 2004, the company became a PLC when it was listed on the Alternative Investment Market of the London Stock Exchange and raised €6.5 mln euro.

Andor Technology PLC was delisted from the AIM stock market following the purchase of all shares for £176 million by Oxford Instruments in December 2013.

In 2016, Andor launched Dragonfly, a high-speed confocal imaging platform supporting multiple high-contrast imaging techniques that integrated Andor’s cameras with patented illumination technologies and optimised optical design, to deliver images characterised by low noise, wide dynamic range, high resolution, and high sensitivity.

In January 2017, the company launched Spectroscopy Mode on its Zyla and iStar scientific CMOS (sCMOS) platforms.

In February of the same year, Andor announced the launch of the ultrasensitive iXon Life Electron Multiplying CCD (EMCCD) camera platform for fluorescence microscopy which features single-photon sensitive, back-illuminated EMCCD technology.

In July, the company launched a super-resolution microscopy technology, available on single photon sensitive iXon EMCCD cameras—SRRF-Stream—enabling real-time super-resolution fluorescence microscopy on most modern microscopes, using conventional fluorophores at low illumination intensities.

In August 2017, Andor’s iKon-XL Astronomy CCD was deployed on Antarctica Bright Star Survey Telescope. Also in August, scientists at Harvard University’s Wyss Institute for Biologically Inspired Engineering have demonstrated Discrete Molecular Imaging, an optical resolution of less than five nanometres which was developed using ultra-sensitive Andor Zyla 4.2/iXon Ultra 897 camera to achieve the highest resolution in optical microscopy.

In January 2018, Andor’s Dragonfly was recognized by the R&D 100 Awards as one of the most Technologically Significant New Analytical Products of the year. In summer 2018 the company introduced ultrasensitive Sona back-illuminated camera platform for fluorescence microscopy, as well as ultrasensitive Marana 4.2B-11 back-illuminated camera platform for physical sciences.

In autumn 2019, Andor announced the launch of the ultra-sensitive Balor, a very large area sCMOS camera for ground-based astronomy applications, with the help of which the Daniel K. Inouye Solar Telescope (DKIST) on the Haleakala, Hawaii, has produced the highest resolution observations of the Sun's surface ever taken.

In April 2020, Andor introduced the Marana 4.2B-6 back-illuminated scientific camera that provides up to −45 °C for 95% quantum performance and vacuum cooling. For dynamic imaging or spectroscopic applications, it offers up to 74 fps, such as wavefront sensing, lucky / speckle imaging, quantum gas dynamics, or hyperspectral imaging. In September of the same year the company started a partnership with AWARE, a Depression Charity for Northern Ireland.

In November 2020 Andor launched high sensitivity camera Marana-X platform for high energy physics, direct soft X-ray, and EUV imaging.

In June 2021, the company held a virtual symposium on quantum technology, semiconductors, and power generation, Andor also partnered with Akoya Biosciences to collaborate in Spatial Omics market.

In November 2021, it introduced BC43, a compact benchtop confocal microscope. The microscope is designed to be simple to use and is based around a Spinning Disk Confocal approach. It incorporates an sCMOS camera and a 4-line laser engine. In August 2022, Andor’s benchtop confocal microscope (BC43) won Microscopy Today Innovation Award, run by the American top-tier publication Microscopy Today.

In June 2022, Andor launched Marana-X-11 sCMOS for EUV & soft X-ray detection. In August 2022, Andor’s benchtop confocal microscope won Microscopy Today Innovation Award.

In January Andor released Imaris 10.0, a new version of its microscopy image analysis software. In April 2023, the company launched the ZL41 Wave sCMOS camera platform for physical sciences, followed by MicroPoint 4 photo-stimulation device.

== Products ==
=== Scientific cameras ===
Andor’s scientific cameras are used in bioimaging (including single molecule studies, live cell imaging, and other applications of microscopy), physical sciences (applications include astronomy, plasma research, etc.), and quantum research.

- EMCCD – due to their high sensitivity, allowing for the detection of faint signals, they are utilised in single-molecule detection, live cell imaging, and other microscopy applications and astronomy.
- sCMOS – Scientific Complementary Metal-Oxide-Semiconductor cameras which are used in fluorescence microscopy, spectroscopy, and quantum research
- ICCD – used in applications that require precise timing control, such as plasma studies or fluorescence lifetime imaging

=== Microscopy systems ===
Andor’s microscopy systems are used in life sciences (neuron imaging, stem cell research, developmental biology studies), bioimaging (like studying the dynamics of proteins within cells or observing cellular responses to drugs or stimuli) and in material sciences.

- Spinning disk confocal microscopes – for capturing high-speed live cell images
- Total internal reflection fluorescence (TIRF) – for studying cellular membranes and their associated molecules
- Multi-photon microscopy systems – utilize two-photon excitation to capture images from thicker samples without causing excessive damage and are used for deep tissue imaging.
