= Hongkai Zhao =

Chinese mathematician

Hongkai Zhao is a Chinese mathematician and Ruth F. DeVarney Distinguished Professor of Mathematics at Duke University. He was formerly the Chancellor's Professor in the Department of Mathematics at the University of California, Irvine. He is known for his work in scientific computing, imaging and numerical analysis, such as the fast sweeping method for Hamilton-Jacobi equation and numerical methods for moving interface problems.

Zhao had obtained his Bachelor of Science degree in the applied mathematics from the Peking University in 1990 and two years later got his Master's in the same field from the University of Southern California. From 1992 to 1996 he attended University of California, Los Angeles where he got his Ph.D. in mathematics. From 1996 to 1998 Zhao was a Gábor Szegő Assistant Professor at the Department of Mathematics of Stanford University and then got promoted to Research Associate which he kept till 1999. He has been at the University of California, Irvine since. At the same time he is also a member of the Institute for Mathematical Behavioral Sciences and the Department of Computer Science of UCI. From 2010 to 2013 and 2016 to 2019, Zhao was the chairman of the Department of Mathematics and since 2016 serves as Chancellor's Professor of mathematics.

Hongkai Zhao received Alfred P. Sloan Fellowship in 2002 and the Feng Kang Prize in Scientific Computing in 2007. He was elected as a Fellow of the Society for Industrial and Applied Mathematics, in the 2022 Class of SIAM Fellows, "for seminal contributions to scientific computation, numerical analysis, and applications in science and engineering".
