= Shadertoy =

Shader making and sharing tool

- Developers: Íñigo Quílez, Pol Jeremias
- Release: 14 February 2013
- Stable release: Release 0.8.3 / 3 March 2016
- Written in: GLSL, JavaScript, PHP
- Type: 3D computer graphics tool community
- Website: www.shadertoy.com

Shadertoy is an online community and tool for creating and sharing shaders through WebGL, used for both learning and teaching 3D computer graphics in a web browser.

== Overview ==
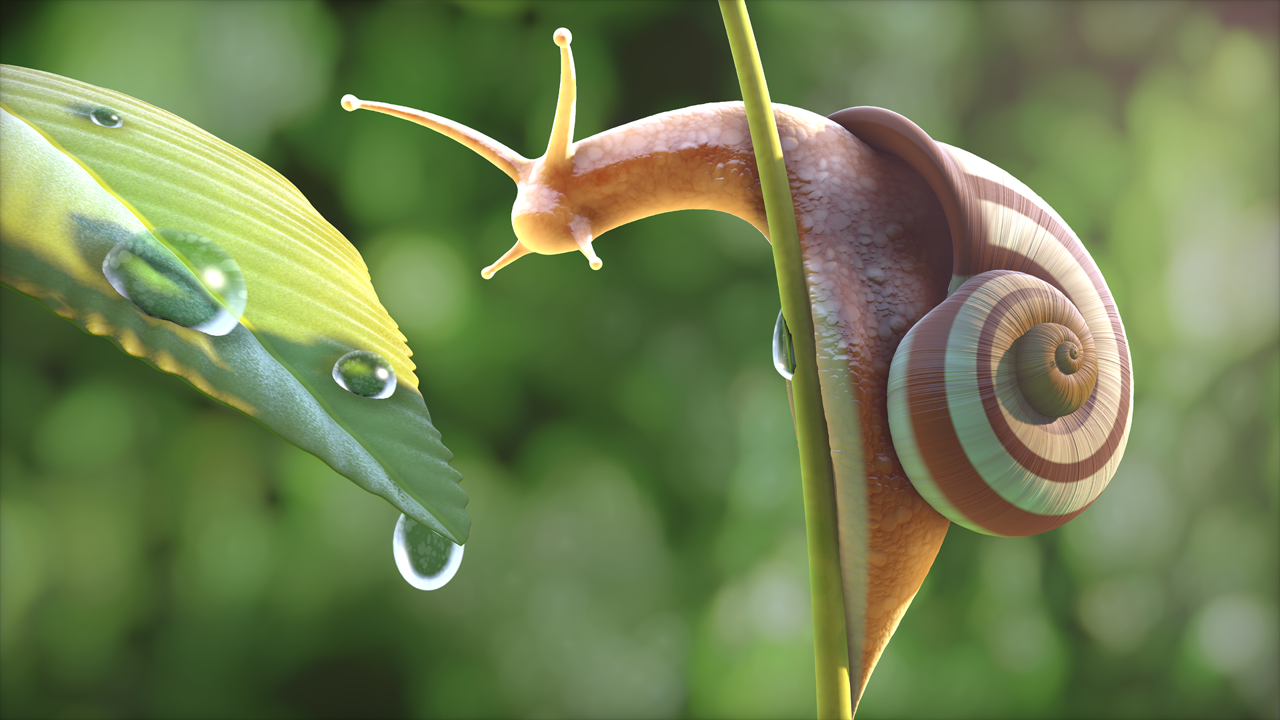
A procedural image made in Shadertoy with distance fields, modeled, shaded, lit and rendered in realtime

Shadertoy is an online community and platform for computer graphics professionals, academics and enthusiasts who share, learn and experiment with rendering techniques and procedural art through GLSL code. There are more than 52 thousand public contributions as of mid-2021 coming from thousands of users. WebGL allows Shadertoy to access the compute power of the GPU to generate procedural art, animation, models, lighting, state based logic and sound.

== History ==
Shadertoy was developed by Pol Jeremias and Íñigo Quílez in January 2013 and came online in February the same year.

The roots of the effort are in Íñigo's "Shadertoy" section in his computer graphics educational website. With the arrival of the initial WebGL implementation by Mozilla's Firefox in 2009, Quílez created the first online live coding environment and curated repository of procedural shaders. This content was donated by 18 authors from the Demoscene and showcased advanced real-time and interactive animations never seen in the Web before, such as raymarched metaballs, fractals and tunnel effects.

After having worked together in several real-time rendering projects together for years, in December 2012 Quílez and Pol decided to create a new Shadertoy site that would follow the tradition of the original Shadertoy page with its demoscene flavored resource and size constrained real-time graphics content, but would add social and community features and embrace an open-source attitude.

The page came out with the live editor, real-time playback, browsing and searching capabilities, tagging and commenting features. Content wise, Shadertoy provided a fixed and limited set of textures for its users to use in creative ways. Over the years Shadertoy added extra features, such as webcam and microphone input support, video, music, Virtual Reality rendering and multi-pass rendering.

There are over 31 thousand contributions in total from thousands of users, several of which are referenced in academic papers. Shadertoy also hosts annual competitions and events.

== Features ==
- Editing: syntax highlighted editor with immediate visual feedback
- Social: commenting on shadertoys, voting (liking)
- Sharing: permanent URLs, embedded in other websites, private shader sharing
- Rendering: floating point buffer based multipass and history
- Media inputs: microphone, webcam, keyboard, mouse, VR HMDs, soundcloud, video, textures

== Mentions ==
Shadertoy is referenced in several sources:

- NVidia developer blog, Jun 2016, Shadertoy Contest 2016 Announced.
- Siggraph Real-Time Live!, 2015, an interactive sound visualizing project.
- Hacker News, 2014, Shadertoy adds procedural GPU-generated music in the browser.
- Numerical Methods for Ray Tracing Implicitly Defined Surfaces,
- CS 371 Course at Williams College, 2014, Inspiration for CS 371
- Real-Time Rendering, Aug 2015, Seven Things for August 20, 2015.
