= Noah Wardrip-Fruin =

- Known for: Digital Media and Interactive Fiction
- Notable work: Grand Text Auto, First Person: New Media as Story, Performance, and Game, How Pac-Man Eats, Expressive Processing

Noah Wardrip-Fruin is a professor in the Computational Media department of the University of California, Santa Cruz, and is an advisor for the Expressive Intelligence Studio. He is an alumnus of the Literary Arts MFA program and Special Graduate Study PhD program at Brown University. In addition to his research in digital media, computer games, and software studies, he served for 10 years as a member of the Board of Directors of the Electronic Literature Organization.

== Career ==
Wardrip-Fruin's twinned research track—arts and humanities on the one hand and computer science on the other—is reflected in the table of the contents of The New Media Reader, which he co-edited with Nick Montfort. He has also co-edited a series of new media textbooks and anthologies with Pat Harrigan: First Person: New Media as Story, Performance, and Game (2004) as well as Second Person: Role-Playing and Story in Games and Playable Media (2007), Third Person: Authoring and Exploring Vast Narratives (2009), and Expressive Processing (2009), all of which have been influential in the development of new media studies.

His collaborative works of electronic literature in installation form include Talking Cure (with Camille Utterback, Clilly Castiglia, and Nathan Wardrip-Fruin; 2002), which includes live video processing, speech recognition, and a dynamically composed sound environment and Screen (with Sascha Becker, Josh Carroll, Robert Coover, Shawn Greenlee, and Andrew McClain; 2003), which was created in the Cave at Brown University. He has also collaborated on what he calls "two textual instruments": News Reader and Regime Change (with David Durand, Brion Moss, and Elaine Froehlich). He also created Gray Matters with Michael Crumpton, Chris Spain and Kristin Allio (1995–97).

His book, Expressive Processing, was published by MIT Press in 2009. In it, as Doug Reside describes, Wardrip-Fruin “makes a compelling case that software studies as a field is not only an interesting avenue of research for new media specialists but also should increasingly be a basic activity of educated citizens in a 21st century democracy.” In 2020, he published another book with MIT Press, How Pac-Man Eats.

== Screen (2003) ==
Wardrip-Fruin's interactive media art piece Screen is an example of digital installation art. To view and interact with the piece, a user first enters a room, called the "Cave," which is a virtual reality display area with four walls surrounding the participant. White memory texts appear on the background of black walls. Through bodily interaction, such as using one's hand, a user can move and bounce the text around the walls. The words can be made into sentences and eventually begin to "peel" off and move more rapidly around the user, creating a heightening sense of misplacement.

"In addition to creating a new form of bodily interaction with text through its play, Screen moves the player through three reading experiences — beginning with the familiar, stable, page-like text on the walls, followed by the word-by-word reading of peeling and hitting (where attention is focused), and with more peripheral awareness of the arrangements of flocking words and the new (often neologistic) text being assembled on the walls. Screen was first shown in 2003 as part of the Boston Cyberarts Festival (in the Cave at Brown University) and documentation of it has since been featured at The Iowa Review Web, presented at SIGGRAPH 2003, included in Alt+Ctrl: a festival of independent and alternative games, published in the DVD magazines Aspect and Chaise, as well as in readings in the Hammer Museum's HyperText series, at ACM Hypertext 2004, and in other venues."

== See also ==
- Game studies
- Interactive storytelling
- List of electronic literature authors, critics, and works
- New Media Art
- New media studies
- New Media
- Software studies
