= The New Media Reader =

2003 anthology by MIT Press

- Author: Noah Wardrip-Fruin and Nick Montfort (editors)
- Cover artist: Michael Crumptonl
- Language: English
- Genre: Textbook
- Publisher: The MIT Press
- Publication date: 2003
- Publication place: United States
- Media type: Print (Hardback
- Pages: 824 pp
- ISBN: 0-262-23227-8

The New Media Reader is a new media textbook edited by Noah Wardrip-Fruin and Nick Montfort and published through The MIT Press. The book reprints over sixty foundational writings first published between 1941 and 1995 that are among the most influential in the field of new media studies. It also includes a CD-ROM with video and software artifacts, dating from the 1960s to 1996.

The purpose of the book, as described by the authors, is to articulate the history of a field that has often gone unheard. They put in extra effort to include illustrations that were often neglected in subsequent printings of the book. The New Media Reader hopes to "assemble a representative collection of critical thoughts, events, and developments... as a new medium, or enabling a new media." By "new media", the editors are not referring to new media at this given moment in time, but rather media that was new and original at the time of its introduction. They mention that many times these ideas seemed radical and unorthodox at the time, but have paved the way from many modern ideas and the authors hope to "provide understanding and offer fuel for inspiration".

== Contents ==
The book includes texts by early new media scholars like Janet Murray, Lev Manovich, Sherry Turkle, Jay David Bolter, Espen Aarseth and Brenda Laurel; by computer scientists and scholars like Vannevar Bush, Alan Turing, Norbert Wiener, Joseph Weizenbaum; by authors and artists like Jorge Luis Borges, Roy Ascott, William S. Burroughs, Nam June Paik, Lynn Herschman, Michael Joyce and the Critical Art Ensemble; and by science and technology scholars like Lucy Suchman and Langdon Winner.

The first edition contained a CD-ROM with digital material, including a video of Alan Kay's talk about Sketchpad, Grail and Dynabook, various early computer games such as Spacewar!, Colossal Cave Adventure and some Atari and Apple II games, examples of electronic literature such as Jim Rosenberg's "Diagram Series 3 and 4" and works by John Cayley, Stuart Moulthrop and Robert Kendall, and by digital artists like Lynn Hershman Leeson. There were also examples of shareware, and other projects.

The CD-ROM was not included in later editions, but some of the digital material is available on the book's website.

== Reception ==
The book was reviewed in many scholarly journals. Reviewers remarked on the heft of the book, with its 800 pages and the CD-ROM - the editors were at pains to demonstrate that the field of new media studies has a long history, despite appearing to many to be completely new. One reviewer noted that the editors had taken great care to design the anthology in a way that mirrors its contents, so it is organised like files in a computer, and includes a "User's manual". Another reviewer praised the detailed annotation of each text provided by the editors.
