= Hayes-Roth =

Hayes-Roth is a surname. Notable people with the surname include:

- Barbara Hayes-Roth, American computer scientist
- Rick Hayes-Roth (born 1947), American computer scientist
