= Expressive Intelligence Studio =

- Established: 2006
- Parent institution: University of California, Santa Cruz
- Affiliation: Baskin School of Engineering
- Advisors: Michael Mateas; Noah Wardrip-Fruin
- Location: Santa Cruz, California, United States
- Subjects: Artificial intelligence; Procedural generation; Authoring system; Information science
- Website: eis.ucsc.edu

The Expressive Intelligence Studio is a research group at the University of California, Santa Cruz, established to conduct research in the field of game design technology. The studio is currently being run by Michael Mateas and Noah Wardrip-Fruin, who work closely with the students in their research.

== History ==
When Michael Mateas formed the group back in 2006, his goal was to "stretch the students into being creative." He did not want the game design program at UCSC to be "just about photo-realistic graphics." Instead he wanted to form an ambitious group of students that grabbed the attention of the gaming industry. According to Noah Wardrip-Fruin, a major benefit for establishing the Expressive Intelligence Studio at UCSC is its proximity to Silicon Valley, where many game companies are located. In 2011, UCSC was listed 7th on Princeton Review's list of top graduate game design programs.

== Research ==
Most of the research done by the Expressive Intelligence Studio is done through major research projects, and focuses primarily on video game AI. PhD students in the program work closely with the advisors on these projects, which have a wide range of topics. Some of these topics include automated support for game generation, automatic generation of autonomous character conversations, story management, and authoring tools for interactive storytelling. This type of research in the field of game design is only being done in a small number of other institutions, such as Massachusetts Institute of Technology, University of Southern California, and Georgia Institute of Technology. According to Mateas, however, the program at the University of California, Santa Cruz Expressive Intelligence Studio strikes a balance between technology and design.

The studio has released several playable games based on research ideas, including Prom Week, the only university-produced finalist in the 2012 Independent Games Festival.

== Example EISbot ==
The EISbot software (short for Expressive Intelligence Studio Bot) is an example for a human-level artificial intelligence which can play Starcraft. It was developed in 2010 for the Conference on Artificial Intelligence and Interactive Digital Entertainment (AIIDE). The AIIDE Starcraft AI Competition is about a game playing agent, who has to win against a human player. EISbot was realized as an agent architecture, which contains submodules for reactive planning, machine learning and case-based reasoning. The reactive planner is the core of EISbot and was realized with A Behavior Language (ABL), which is an action language similar to STRIPS. The behaviors are planned with so called managers who are responsible for subgoals like production, income, tactics and scouting behavior.

== See also ==
- Game studies
- Interactive storytelling
- New media studies
- New Media
- New Media Art
- Game artificial intelligence
