= Coin3D =

Free and open-source graphics API

- Developer: Kongsberg Oil & Gas Technologies (formerly known as Kongsberg SIM)
- Stable release: 4.0.6 / October 10, 2025; 18 days ago
- Repository: github.com/coin3d/coin
- Written in: C++
- Operating system: Cross-platform
- Type: scene graph API
- License: BSD license
- Website: coin3d.org

Coin3D is a free and open-source implementation (library) of the Open Inventor API. Coin3D was originally developed and maintained as commercial software by the Norwegian company Kongsberg Oil & Gas Technologies (formerly Kongsberg SIM). Coin3D, like Open Inventor, is a C++ object-oriented retained mode 3D graphics API used to provide a higher layer of programming for OpenGL. The API provides a number of common graphics rendering constructs to developers such as scene graphs to accomplish this. Coin3D is fully compatible with the Open Inventor API version 2.1. Coin3D can be used to drive advanced visualization solutions in a wide range of application domains such as geo-modelling, CAD, medical visualization, robotics and presentation.

== Uses ==
According to Kongsberg Oil & Gas Technologies, the software is used in a number of commercial and open-source, scientific visualization or 3D modeling projects such as OpenRAVE. Apple, for example, used Coin for 3D rendering in iWork '08 and later. FreeCAD relies on Coin3D for visualization.

== License history ==
From 1998 to 2011 Coin3D was developed and maintained by Systems in Motion (SIM), later renamed to Kongsberg SIM, later merged into the parent company Kongsberg Oil & Gas Technologies Kongsberg Gruppen. During this period Coin3D was available under a dual license scheme: GPL or a proprietary commercial license. Mid-2011, Kongsberg decided to end Coin3D as a commercial product due to diminishing demand and changing business focus. As a service to the user community Kongsberg re-licensed Coin3D under the less restrictive BSD 3-clause license. Since then, the BSD licensed source code has been maintained by its users and is available at GitHub.

== Integration with GUI development kits ==
Several libraries exist that are designed to integrate Coin3D with GUI development environments.

- For developers targeting multi-platform - 'Quarter' provides a seamless integration with the Qt framework.
- For developers targeting Windows - 'SoWin' integrates with the Win32 API.
- For developers targeting Mac OS X - Sc21 provides integration with Apple's Cocoa framework

Legacy GUI bindings are Qt (SoQt), Win32 API (SoWin) and Motif (SoXt) are also maintained.

== Language bindings ==
Coin3D is written in C++, but can be accessed from other programming languages using available bindings. Bindings have been developed for Python Pivy, Java and JavaScript.
