= Immediate mode =

Immediate mode may refer to

- Immediate mode (computer graphics), a graphical rendering mode
  - Immediate mode GUI, GUI or widget toolkit implemented using immediate mode style
- Direct mode, an operational mode for interpreters
