= Andrew Stern =

Andrew Stern may refer to:

- Andy Stern, president of the Service Employees International Union
- Andrew Stern (video game designer), co-designer of the artificial intelligence experiment Façade (video game)
- Andrew Stern (tennis), American tennis player in 1952, 1953 and 1954 U.S. National Championships – Men's Singles
