= Cave automatic virtual environment =

Immersive virtual reality environment

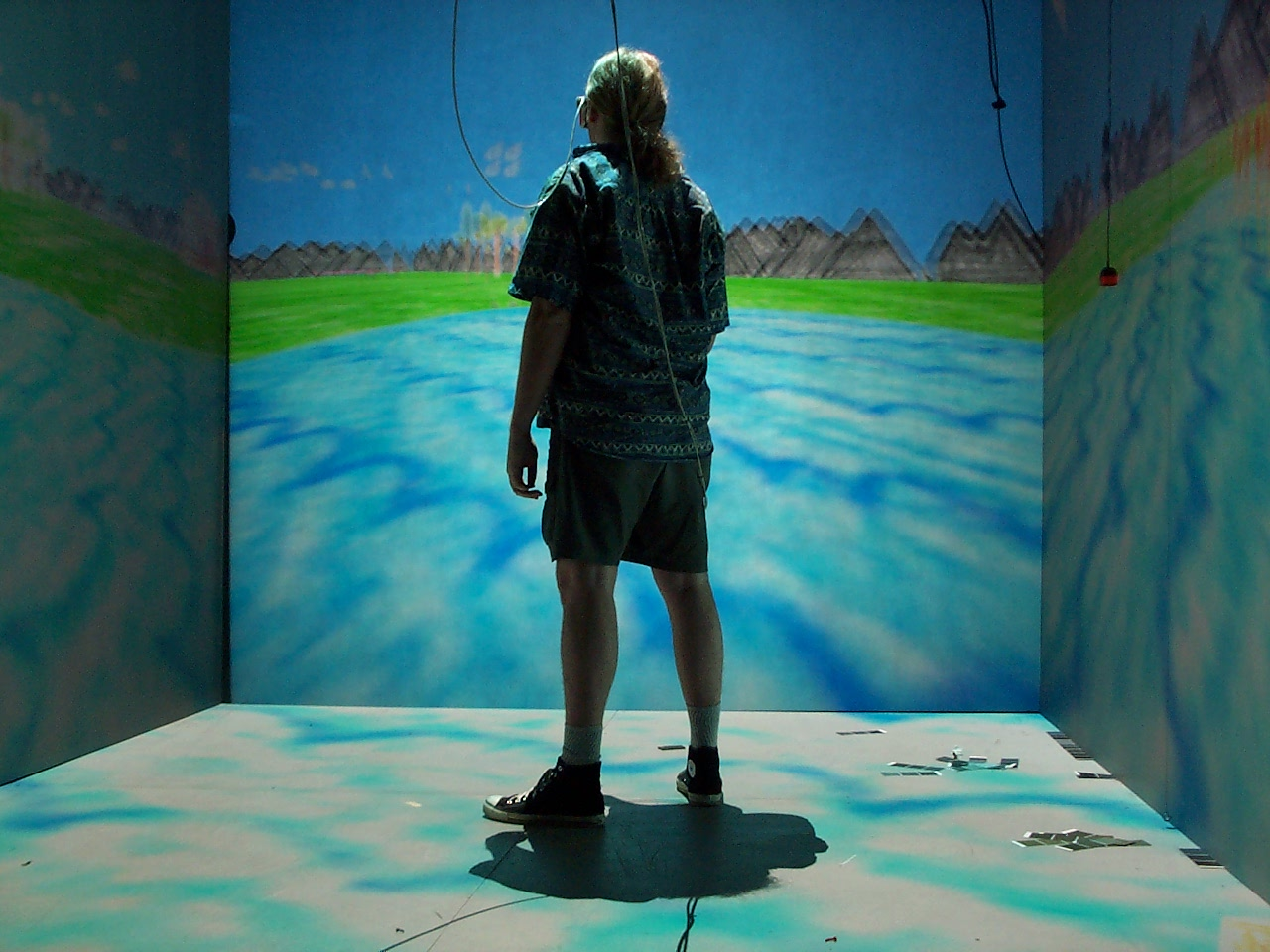
The CAVE

A cave automatic virtual environment (better known by the recursive acronym CAVE) is an immersive virtual reality environment where projectors are directed to between three and six of the walls of a room-sized cube. The name is also a reference to the allegory of the Cave in Plato's Republic in which a philosopher contemplates perception, reality, and illusion. CAVE is considered to be one of the first VR "rooms".

The CAVE was invented by Carolina Cruz-Neira, Daniel J. Sandin, and Thomas A. DeFanti at the University of Illinois, Chicago Electronic Visualization Laboratory in 1992. The images on the walls were in stereo to give a depth cue.

== General characteristics ==
A CAVE is typically a video theater situated within a larger room. The walls of a CAVE are typically made up of rear-projection screens, however large-scale LED displays are becoming more common. The floor can be a downward-projection screen, a bottom projected screen, or a flat panel display. The projection systems are very high-resolution due to the near distance viewing which requires very small pixel sizes to retain the illusion of reality. The user wears 3D glasses inside the CAVE to see 3D graphics generated by the CAVE. People using the CAVE can see objects apparently floating in the air, and can walk around them, getting a proper view of what they would look like in reality. This was initially made possible by electromagnetic sensors, but has converted to infrared cameras. The frame of early CAVEs had to be built from non-magnetic materials such as wood to minimize interference with the electromagnetic sensors; the change to infrared tracking has removed that limitation. A CAVE user's movements are tracked by the sensors typically attached to the 3D glasses and the video continually adjusts to retain the viewers perspective. Computers control both this aspect of the CAVE and the audio aspect. There are typically multiple speakers placed at multiple angles in the CAVE, providing 3D sound to complement the 3D video.

== Technology ==
A lifelike visual display is created by projectors positioned outside the CAVE and controlled by physical movements from a user inside the CAVE. A motion capture system records the real time position of the user. Stereoscopic LCD shutter glasses convey a 3D image. The computers rapidly generate a pair of images, one for each of the user's eyes, based on the motion capture data. The glasses are synchronized with the projectors so that each eye only sees the correct image. Since the projectors are positioned outside the cube, mirrors are often used to reduce the distance required from the projectors to the screens. One or more computers drive the projectors. Clusters of desktop PCs are popular to run CAVEs, because they cost less and run faster.

Software and libraries designed specifically for CAVE applications are available. There are several techniques for rendering the scene. There are three popular scene graphs in use today: OpenSG, OpenSceneGraph, and OpenGL Performer. OpenSG and OpenSceneGraph are open source; while OpenGL Performer is free, its source code is not included.

== Calibration ==
To be able to create an image that will not be distorted or out of place, the displays and sensors must be calibrated. The calibration process depends on the motion capture technology being used. Optical or Inertial-acoustic systems only requires to configure the zero and the axes used by the tracking system. Calibration of electromagnetic sensors (like the ones used in the first cave) is more complex. In this case a person will put on the special glasses needed to see the images in 3D. The projectors then fill the CAVE with many one-inch boxes set one foot apart. The person then takes an instrument called an "ultrasonic measurement device" which has a cursor in the middle of it, and positions the device so that the cursor is visually in line with the projected box. This process can go on until almost 400 different blocks are measured. Each time the cursor is placed inside a block, a computer program records the location of that block and sends the location to another computer. If the points are calibrated accurately, there should be no distortion in the images that are projected in the CAVE. This also allows the CAVE to correctly identify where the user is located and can precisely track their movements, allowing the projectors to display images based on where the person is inside the CAVE.

== Applications ==
Researchers can use CAVE system to conduct their research topic in a more accessible and effective method. For example, CAVEs was applied on the investigation of training subjects on landing an F-16 aircraft. At Brown University, novelist Robert Coover taught electronic literature students to create literary works for the CAVE; Screen is a VR work to come out of this.

An early artistic application of the CAVE was conFIGURING the CAVE (1996), created by Jeffrey Shaw, Agnes Hegedüs and Bernd Lintermann, with music by Leslie Stuck. Visitors manipulated a wooden mannequin to control projected images and sounds in a four-walled projection space.

The EVL team at UIC released the CAVE2 in October 2012. Similar to the original CAVE, it is a 3D immersive environment but is based on LCD panels rather than projection.

== See also ==
- Virtual reality
