= Open Inventor =

3D graphics kernel

Open Inventor [by SGI]
- Logo of Open Inventor
- Stable release: 2.1.5.10 / 2003; 23 years ago
- Type: 3D graphics toolkit
- License: GNU Lesser General Public License
- Website: web.archive.org/web/20170811183842/http://oss.sgi.com/projects/inventor/
- Repository: github.com/aumuell/open-inventor

Open Inventor, originally IRIS Inventor, is a C++ object-oriented retained mode 3D graphics toolkit designed by SGI to provide a higher layer of programming for OpenGL. Its main goals are better programmer convenience and efficiency. Open Inventor exists as both proprietary software and free and open-source software, subject to the requirements of the GNU Lesser General Public License (LGPL), version 2.1.

The primary objective was to make 3D programming accessible by introducing an object-oriented API, allowing developers to create complex scenes without the intricacies of low-level OpenGL. The toolkit incorporated features like scene graphs, pre-defined shapes, and automatic occlusion culling to streamline scene management. While Open Inventor focused on ease of use, the OpenGL Performer project, spawned from the same context, emphasized performance optimization. The two projects later converged in an attempt to strike a balance between accessibility and performance, culminating in initiatives like Cosmo 3D and OpenGL++. These projects underwent various stages of development and refinement, contributing to the evolution of 3D graphics programming paradigms.

== Early history ==
Around 1988–1989, Wei Yen asked Rikk Carey to lead the IRIS Inventor project. Their goal was to create a toolkit that made developing 3D graphics applications easier to do. The strategy was based on the premise that people were not developing enough 3D applications with IRIS GL because it was too time-consuming to do so with the low-level interface provided by IRIS GL. If 3D programming were made easier, through the use of an object oriented API, then more people would create 3D applications and SGI would benefit. Therefore, the credo was always “ease of use” before “performance”, and soon the tagline “3D programming for humans” was being used widely.

== Use ==
OpenGL (OGL) is a low level application programming interface that takes lists of simple polygons and renders them as quickly as possible. To do something more practical like “draw a house”, the programmer must break down the object into a series of simple OGL instructions and send them into the engine for rendering. One problem is that OGL performance is highly sensitive to the way these instructions are sent into the system, requiring the user to know which instructions to send and in which order, and forcing them to carefully cull the data to avoid sending in objects that aren't even visible in the resulting image. For simple programs a tremendous amount of programming has to be done just to get started.

Open Inventor (OI) was written to address this issue, and provide a common base layer to start working with. Objects could be subclassed from a number of pre-rolled shapes like cubes and polygons, and then easily modified into new shapes. The “world” to be drawn was placed in a scene graph run by OI, with the system applying occlusion culling on objects in the graph automatically. OI also included a number of controller objects and systems for applying them to the scene, making common interaction tasks easier. Finally, OI also supplied a common file format for storing “worlds,” and the code to automatically save or load a world from these files. Basic 3D applications could then be written in a few hundred lines under OI, by tying together portions of the toolkit with “glue” code.

On the downside OI tended to be slower than hand-written code, as 3D tasks are notoriously difficult to make perform well without shuffling the data in the scene graph by hand. Another practical problem was that OI could only be used with its own file format, forcing developers to write converters to and from the internal system.

== Performer ==
About a year into the Inventor project, a different philosophy began to emerge. Instead of simply making it easy to write applications on SGI systems, the goal was changed to make it difficult to write slow applications. Members of the Inventor team left to form their own group, which founded the basis of the OpenGL Performer project. Performer was also based on an internal scene graph, but was allowed to modify it for better speed as it saw fit, even dropping “less important” objects and polygons in order to maintain guaranteed performance levels. Performer also used a number of processes to run tasks in parallel for added performance, allowing it to be run (in one version) on multiple processors. Unlike Inventor, Performer remained proprietary so that SGI would have the agility to modify the API as needed to keep in step with the latest hardware enhancements.

== Mid 1990s ==
At some point in the mid-1990s it was realized that there was no good reason that the two systems could not be combined, resulting in a single high-level API with both performance and programmability. SGI started work on yet another project aimed at merging the two, eventually culminating in Cosmo 3D. However Cosmo had a number of practical problems that could have been avoided with better design.

Eventually all of these ideas would come together to create the OpenGL++ effort, along with Intel, IBM and DEC. Essentially a cleaned up and more “open” version of Cosmo 3D, work on Cosmo ended and SGI turned to OpenGL++ full-time. The OpenGL++ effort would drag on and eventually be killed, and SGI then tried again with Microsoft with the similar Fahrenheit project, which also died. In 1994 SGI licensed Open Inventor to two third-party developers, Template Graphics Software (TGS) and Portable Graphics; in 1996 TGS bought Portable Graphics, making them the sole licensee.

== Recent history ==
After many years of being solely available under proprietary licensing from TGS (now FEI), Inventor was released under the LGPL open source license in August 2000 and is available from SGI. Around the same time, the Coin3D API clone library was released by SIM (Systems in Motion). SIM was later acquired by the Kongsberg group and renamed Kongsberg SIM. The Coin library had been written in a clean-room fashion from scratch, sharing no code with the original SGI Inventor library but implementing the same API for compatibility reasons. Kongsberg ended development of Coin3D in 2011, and released the code under the BSD 3-clause license.

The open-source version from SGI is not maintained, and SGI has not indicated a commitment to further develop the library. The open-source release is used in MeVisLab (MeVis Medical Solutions AG and Fraunhofer MEVIS), however, and development of that continues. Thermo Scientific Open Inventor is still being developed, and has added a number of improvements to the original Inventor API for medical imaging, medical image computing, 3D reflection seismology, and petroleum reservoir modeling.

The Open Inventor API is still commonly used for a wide range of scientific and engineering visualization systems around the world for the development of complex 3D application software. TGS was acquired by Mercury Computer Systems in 2004. It became an independent company, Visualization Sciences Group (VSG), in June 2009. In 2012, VSG was acquired by FEI Company. FEI Company was acquired in 2016 by the Thermo Fisher Scientific Materials & Structural Analysis Division, which continues to develop (and support) Open Inventor.
