= Expressive Processing =

- Author: Noah Wardrip-Fruin
- Language: English
- Genre: Textbook
- Publisher: MIT Press
- Publication date: 2009
- Publication place: United States
- Media type: Print (hardcover)
- Pages: 480
- ISBN: 978-0-262-01343-7

Expressive Processing: Digital Fictions, Computer Games, and Software Studies is a digital media textbook authored by Noah Wardrip-Fruin and published through the MIT Press. Throughout the book Wardrip-Fruin takes a look into "expressive processing" elements that partake in digital media. Wardrip-Fruin attempts to explain expressive processing through the ELIZA effect, The Tale-Spin Effect, The SimCity Effect, and many other elements of interactive digital media.
