= Hamlet on the Holodeck =

1997 book by Janet H. Murray

- 1997 Book Cover
- Author: Janet H. Murray
- Language: English
- Genre: Interactive Multimedia, Literature
- Publisher: MIT Press
- Publication date: 1997
- Publication place: United States of America
- Media type: Book
- Pages: 342
- ISBN: 068482723-9

Hamlet on the Holodeck: The Future of Narrative in Cyberspace is a 1997 book by Janet H. Murray about digital technology's influence on the development of narrative. Murray analyzes interactive cinema, hypertext fiction, and the future of storytelling. In this book, Murray explores how narratives may change in stories based on new interactive mediums. Murray discusses her fears of storytelling as well as boundaries that we must set, the four essential properties of digital environments, and accurately predicts new media genres such as MUDs, 3-D films, etc.

== Background ==
After Janet Murray earned her bachelor's degree, she became employed at IBM, where she would be surrounded by a virtual environment that was more technologically advanced than what most people experienced in their daily lives. Murray saved up money from the position to go and attend graduate school at Harvard University as she would later go on to graduate with her Ph.D. in English. After her newfound perspective in English she taught at Georgia Tech where she discovered games like Zork and Eliza, which were presented to her by her students in the 1980s. This got her interested in games studies where she pondered how new interactive interfaces could mesh with narrative formats. She began to combine her expertise in technology and English as she contemplated ways in which a new form of storytelling could arise. This was the inspiration that led to her writing Hamlet on the Holodeck.

== Synopsis ==
Hamlet on the Holodeck is made of an introduction and four parts, in which Murray examines storytelling media. In part one, "A New Medium for Storytelling", Murray examines the use of the holodeck as it first appeared in Star Trek: The Next Generation and the holonovel Janeway Lambda One, which was used by Starfleet Captain Kathryn Janeway from Star Trek: Voyager as an escape from her responsibilities. Murray states that this illustrates the future of storytelling and that the holodeck is "an optimistic technology for exploring inner life." She also examines works that have multiple stories within a single story described as a multiform story and identifies four essential properties of digital media: procedural, participatory, spatial, and encyclopedic.

In part 2, "The Aesthetics of the Medium", Murray examines immersive experiences, which she describes as fragile and easily disrupted. She also explores agency, which she defines as "the satisfying power to take meaningful action and see the results of our decisions and choices" and the ability of technology to transform anything digital. In the following parts, "Procedural Authorship" and "New Beauty, New Truth", Murray discusses the impact of users being able to interact with a multiform plot, which she feels are more appealing and satisfying in the new digital environment. She also examines technology via chatbots such as Julia and the possible future of the cyberdrama and its many formats.

== Analysis ==
In Hamlet on the Holodeck, Murray provides a detailed accurate prediction of what she sees as the future of narratives in cyberspace. She focuses on the delicate boundary between the viewer and the narrative, imagining a future with participatory involvement with different cyberdramas. She encourages us to not be afraid of the ever changing future of technology and to welcome the world of virtual reality as we did with past technologies that have come and gone. Throughout the reading, she reassures us that we are in complete control of how we perceive this new type technology that is best exemplified as the holodeck.

== Publication ==
Hamlet on the Holodeck was originally published in 1997 by MIT Press. Its second edition, published in 2017, includes a new introduction and chapter commentaries. Murray's 2016 edition of this book consists of the same core content in each of the chapters in the original edition and does not add or take away from the content within the publication however, the second edition of the book consists of updates to include brief updates after each chapter, along with more recent twenty-first century examples, and a revised bibliography. The updates in Murray's 2016 edition serve the purpose of summarizing her original thesis.

== Reception ==
The first publication of Hamlet on the Holodeck was published in 1997 and was both praised and condemned by literary critics. Many felt that the book consisted of extremely controversial claims. Upon its initial release, popular critic Michiko Kakutani expressed that Murray's work ignored the possible downsides of technology while embracing "utopian" ideals. Many agreed that the book seemed daunting or even "unsettling" when first introduced to the public in the late 1990s, while more recent critics have come to recognize the accuracy of Murray's predictions regarding the new medium for storytelling.

== See also ==
- Convergence Culture
- ELIZA
- The medium is the message
- Zork
