= Façade (video game) =

2005 video game

- Splash screen
- Developer: Procedural Arts (Note: Ported to Mac OS X by Ryan C. Gordon of icculus.org.)
- Publisher: Procedural Arts
- Designers: Michael Mateas; Andrew Stern
- Composers: Billy Gomberg; Matt Ganucheau; Jim Doran; Aaron Acosta; Leo Caruso
- Platforms: Windows, Mac OS X
- Release: Windows; July 5, 2005; Mac OS X; August 15, 2006
- Genres: Interactive drama, interactive fiction, social simulation
- Mode: Single-player

Façade is a 2005 interactive storytelling video game by Michael Mateas and Andrew Stern. Conceived by the developers as an "interactive drama", Façade tasks the player to use text input to converse with two characters, Trip and Grace, who are experiencing conflicts in their relationship. The game uses artificial intelligence methods, including natural language processing, to simulate a conversation between the player and two characters. The developers, Mateas and Stern, both carried an interest in artificial intelligence and interactive entertainment, and began work on the game in 1998.

Upon release, Façade received praise for its innovative design and generated commentary about the potential use of artificial intelligence in video games. It received the Grand Jury prize at the Slamdance Independent Games Festival and was a finalist for the 2004 Seumas McNally Grand Prize. Following release, Façade received further retrospective praise for its design, although sources expressed mixed views on the contemporary impact and influence of the game. Façade is the subject of numerous scholarly analyses, and has been discussed both as a digital play and as electronic literature.

Due to the awkward and unexpected behaviour that could occur from its interaction model, the game generated a cult following and Internet memes from Let's Play videos on YouTube. A planned sequel, The Party, began development in 2006, discontinued in 2013, and resumed in 2024.

== Gameplay ==
Played in a first-person perspective, the game is set in an apartment where the player can move around freely using the keyboard. Prior to starting the game, the player also selects a name from a list, which is reflected in how the game's two characters, Trip and Grace, address them. Players interact with Trip and Grace using text input to speak, or can use the mouse to select parts of their body to interact with, including options to comfort, hug or kiss the characters at any time.

The game uses natural language processing, identifying certain key words in player input and deducing its context, to influence the conversation and the reaction of Trip and Grace to the player's conduct. The couple can react to these in several ways, such as laughter, excitement, surprise, and anger. If the player behaves inappropriately, Trip and Grace react with great offense. Persistent rudeness can lead to the player's removal, and so does excessive physical intimacy. The behaviour of the characters and the progression of the narrative is open-ended, influenced by these interactions. Players can also click to interact with various objects and pieces of furniture in the apartment, which prompt reactions or new conversations from the characters.

== Plot ==
Façade is an interactive drama video game, structured as a one-act story about a married couple, Trip and Grace. The player assumes the role of a long-time friend, invited for an evening get-together at the couple's apartment in New York City. At first, Trip and Grace are friendly, but they become hostile as the player witnesses the devolution of their marriage.

The game begins with a black screen and a voiceover from Trip, who is calling the player to invite them to the apartment. After the player has chosen their name, they spawn in front of the door, overhearing an argument between the couple. Afterwards, Trip opens the door and lets the player inside. The player can discuss various topics with Grace and Trip during their stay, such as the couple's recent vacation in Italy, the drinks Trip prepares at the bar, and Grace's attempts at redecorating the apartment. Other subjects of conversation can be about their work, hobbies, families, sex life, or the prospect of their divorce.

As Façade progresses, the couple gets into a fight, exchanging various accusations and passive-aggressive remarks. The player is prompted to take sides in the argument, which culminates in either Grace or Trip asking them a question about their relationship. When the game approaches its final phase, the couple seek advice from their friend about how to fix their marriage and what is wrong with either of them.

Eventually, Grace and/or Trip can confess a long-kept secret about themselves or the relationship, such as either having a sexual affair without telling the other. Afterwards, Façade will end in three ways: either Trip or Grace end their relationship, the two reconcile, or they tell the player that nothing has changed and continue arguing once they have left. The game is meant to be replayed several times, so that the player can discover other ways their conversations with the couple could have gone.

== Development ==
Mateas co-developed Façade with Andrew Stern over five years, self-funded and with a limited budget. Prior to development, Mateas was a doctoral student at the Carnegie Mellon School of Computer Science, and Stern was a programmer and designer on the virtual pet video game series Petz. Mateas and Stern met presenting at a series of conferences on the intersection of artificial intelligence and interactive entertainment, and began initial work in 1998 on a long-term "interactive drama piece" and "commercial product prototype".

In 2000, Mateas and Stern formally commenced a full-time collaborative project to "build an interactive story world integrating believable agents and interactive plot", with a plan to create a game around a "domestic drama in which a married couple has invited a player over for dinner." To develop organic and believable character behaviors, Mateas and Stern developed a complex programming framework named "A Behaviour Language" to program and organize the expressions of multiple characters as "believable agents", and a "drama manager" to organise events in the story to guide the interactions towards a tension and resolution of the plot. Façade was released for Windows in July 2005 as a free download from the developers' web site.

Following the release of Façade, Mateas and Stern planned to create a follow-up project titled The Party. Building on the design of Façade, The Party was planned to feature around the plot of being invited a dinner party, in which gameplay would be expanded to accommodate ten characters, greater environmental interaction, and more mature complex narrative beats, including sex and violence. Intended as a commercial product, Stern noted that The Party required investment to fund a small team of designers and programmers necessary to create the game's artificial intelligence. In 2013, Mateas confirmed that development on The Party had ceased in order to pursue other projects. In September 2024, Mateas and Stern stated in an interview that development has resumed.

== Reception ==
Many critics gave Façade positive reviews at the time of its release. Several publications like NBC News, The New York Times, Newsweek, and The Boston Phoenix praised the game for its technical achievements, writing that it was an important step for the evolution of video games, interactive entertainment, and AI. Gamasutra wrote that Façade was "one of the most important games ever created, possibly the most important game of the last ten years," above The Sims and Grand Theft Auto. The reviewer, Ernest Adams, called the game's design "revolutionary" and "technically ambitious", listing five areas of technical achievement: its natural language parsing and conversational interaction, natural language generation, emotional modelling, facial expressions, and body language. The Economist mused: "as graphics improve, artificial intelligence is becoming an ever more important part of designing video games."

Critics also wrote about how the game handled its characters and story, and they also found its attempts innovative. Adams praised Façade for being unlike most video games at the time, highlighting its lack of a victory condition and focus on personal relationships that he found believable. Many others said that Façade showed, with complex AI, that video games could be just as compelling when they are character-driven instead of action-driven. As Set Schiesel, who did the New York Times review, wrote: "[this] is a future where games are driven as strongly by characters as combat [and] as much soap opera as shooting gallery". Newsweek and NBC News argued that Façade represented a step in the right direction for creating interactive drama characters with emotional depth; Newsweek said that this had special appeal towards female gamers, who began to be represented only within the past decade. Other publications covered the game's open-ended nature and praised how the player could change the story in real time instead of adhering to a pre-determined narrative branch. In the views of Wired, Façade's approach provided a more immersive experience.

Façade won the Grand Jury Prize at the 2006 Slamdance Independent Games Festival. An early version of the game was also nominated as a finalist for the Open category of the Seumas McNally Grand Prize at the 2004 Independent Games Festival.

== Legacy ==
Grace and Trip's awkward reactions to what the AI considered inappropriate behavior, which did not always make sense, made Façade the subject of several comedic videos and Internet memes, causing it to develop a cult following years after its release.

Retrospective assessments of Façade have recognized the game's technical achievement in its application of artificial intelligence and popular appeal. Describing the game as an "important research and cultural milestone", Game Developer, formerly Gamasutra, identified Façade as a project that made an "indelible mark on video games" due to the uniqueness and complexity of its design of artificial intelligence. Similarly, The Guardian cited Façade as an "interesting" milestone and "fascinating experiment" in the advancement of emotional artificial intelligence. The game was also recognized to have attracted mainstream attention, unusual for an independent video game at the time. Rock Paper Shotgun noted the game "was cutting edge enough to warrant scientific papers being written about it, but playable and interesting enough to be spread around the games world".

Throughout the decade since its release, Façade developed a cult following and spawned several Internet memes, largely due to "Let's Play" videos on YouTube that exploited Grace and Trip's awkward reactions to what the AI deemed inappropriate behavior, which was sometimes nonsensical. Many high-profile YouTubers at the time accrued millions of views on their playthroughs; PC Gamer attributed the game's "second coming as an Internet meme" to PewDiePie's first video about the game, which garnered over seven million views, and also named Jacksepticeye and The Gaming Lemon as further contributors to increasing Façade's mainstream exposure. Game Developer commented that "arguably [Façade's] biggest impact is that people know what it is outside of the academic conference circuit".

Some retrospective reviews have expressed mixed views on Façade's execution as a simulation of interpersonal interaction, with Rock Paper Shotgun observing that the subsequent influence of the game on the broader industry had been largely overstated. PC Gamer noted that "if you play Façade as it was intended...their AI system holds up remarkably well", praising the character reactions to player inputs, although noting the game's "reliance on genuine interaction...makes it ripe for abuse". Describing the game as "an experiment rather than a finished game", Chris Dahlen, writing for 1001 Video Games You Must Play Before You Die, noted "the graphics are basic, and the parser's not perfect; Grace and Trip often react to a suggestion they don't recognize with an awkward stare or look of horror." Although considering the game's praise as warranted and "hugely influential" of its time, Julie Fukunaga of Stanford Daily critiqued the game as "visually jarring" and "frequently glitchy", finding the narrative presented an unrealistic representation of marital conflict and featured "irredeemable characters".

== See also ==
- Cybertext
- Expressive Intelligence Studio
