= Scrapbook (Mac OS) =

Macintosh computer software

Scrapbook version 7.5.2 (1996), showing a QuickDraw-3D-based 3D model

Scrapbook under the Classic Mac OS was a small desk accessory (DA) which enabled users to store images, text and sound clippings.

== Software ==
It was included in the original Macintosh system software in 1984 with the Macintosh 128K, and was included throughout every Mac OS revision until Mac OS 9.

Since early versions of Mac OS were not capable of multitasking—they could only run one application at a time—a specially-written DA such as Scrapbook was the only means of keeping content readily accessible to be pasted into documents.

Starting in Scrapbook version 7.5.2, Scrapbook could also store QuickDraw 3D-based 3D models. It came with two 3D models in this version; one of a palm tree and one of a pencil.
