= Janet Murray =

American academic

Janet H. Murray
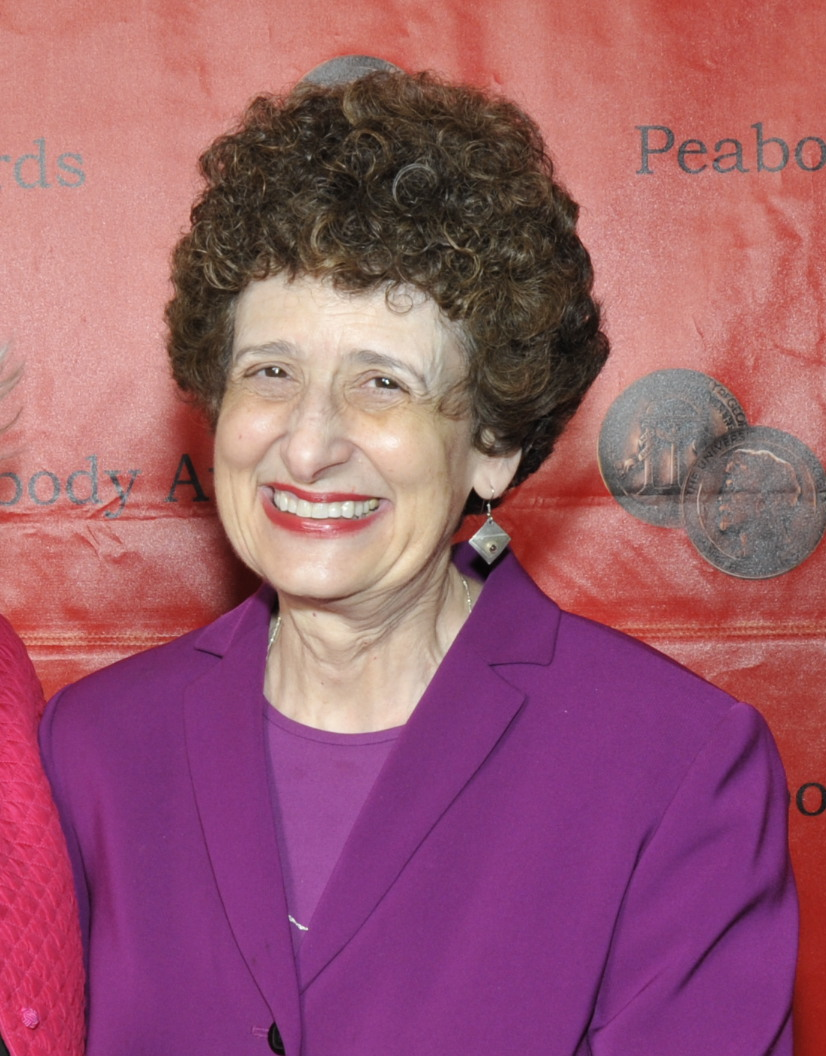
- Murray, in 2011
- Born: 1946 (age 79–80); New York City
- Education: Harvard University
- Known for: Digital media
- Notable work: Hamlet on the Holodeck: The Future of Narrative in Cyberspace, The New Media Reader, Inventing the Medium

Janet Horowitz Murray (born 1946) is an American professor in the School of Literature, Media, and Communication at the Georgia Institute of Technology. Before coming to Georgia Tech in 1999, she was a Senior Research Scientist in the Center for Educational Computing Initiatives at MIT, where she taught humanities and led advanced interactive design projects since 1971. She is well known as an early developer of humanities computing applications, a seminal theorist of digital media, and an advocate of new educational programs in digital media.

== Work and contributions ==
Janet Murray designed projects include a digital edition of the Warner Brothers classic, Casablanca. In addition she directs an eTV Prototyping Group, which has worked on interactive television applications for PBS, ABC, MTV, Turner, and other networks. She also works extensively as a member of Georgia Tech's Experimental Game Lab and is an advisor to Georgia Tech's Mobile Technology Group.

Murray's major book is Hamlet on the Holodeck: The Future of Narrative in Cyberspace, which asks whether the computer can provide the basis for an expressive narrative form, just as print technology supported the development of the novel and film technology supported the development of movies (originally published in 1997 and updated in 2017). She provides an optimistic answer. Murray’s analysis rests on an understanding of the computer as a medium of representation with a distinct set of properties. She argues that the computer is procedural, participatory, encyclopedic, and spatial, and that it affords three characteristic (but not unique) pleasures: immersion, agency, and transformation. She defines interactivity as the combination of the procedural and the participatory property which together afford the pleasure of agency. She connects research work on artificial intelligence with cultural forms such as games, movies, literature, and television. Murray’s main point is that the new computer formats expand the possibilities of expression available for storytelling. To her, "digital transmission has opened up the possibility of long-form storytelling, since audiences can view whole seasons after their original broadcast date, and they can follow story over multiple seasons."

Murray was a guest writer for Noah Wardrip-Fruin and Nick Montfort The New Media Reader, an anthology of articles on the new media which Janet was the first of the two introduction in the book called "Inventing the Medium."

Murray’s work has been referenced by game designers, interactive television producers, filmmakers, and journalists. It has been criticized from opposing directions, by writer Sven Birkerts as a threat to print culture (in HotWired magazine and in a televised debate) and by ludologists as an inappropriately literary approach to games (Game Studies vol. 1 no. 1). Murray has been described as a narratologist as she advocates for storytelling in gameplay.

Murray also has an active role in developing two new degree programs at Georgia Tech which were launched in 2004: the Ph.D. in digital media and the B.S. in Computational Media. She was a member of the Peabody Awards Board of Jurors from 2007 to 2013.

Murray wrote the foreword for Celia Pearce's Playframes: How do we know we are playing?

== Accomplishments ==
- Spring of 2000, American Film Institute named Janet Murray their Trustee as she is also a mentor AFI Digital Content Lab.
- Her projects from digital media curricula, interactive narrative, story/games, interactive television, to large-scale multimedia information spaces.have been funded by IBM, Apple Computer, Annenberg-CPB Project, the Andrew W. Mellon Foundation, the National Endowment for the Humanities, and the National Science Foundation.
- Next Generation Magazine named her one of the top 100 Most Influential Women in Games in 2006

== See also ==
- Simulated reality
- Video game theory
- New media art
