= Barbara Hayes-Roth =

American computer scientist

Barbara (Bella) Hayes-Roth is an American computer scientist and psychologist whose research in artificial intelligence includes work on knowledge acquisition,^{[A]} automated planning and scheduling,^{[B]} spatial cognition,^{[C]} the blackboard system,^{[D]} real-time computing,^{[E]} adaptation,^{[F]} and intelligent behavior in interactive storytelling.^{[G]} She was a senior research scientist and lecturer in computer science at Stanford University 1982–2002. She holds two patents on interactive characters and founded Extempo Systems, Inc.

== Education and career ==
Hayes-Roth majored in psychology at Boston University, graduating magna cum laude in 1971. She went to the University of Michigan for graduate study in psychology, earning a master's degree in 1973 and completing her Ph.D. in 1974. Her dissertation, Interactions in the Acquisition and Utilization of Structured Knowledge, was supervised by Robert Bjork.

She became a researcher at Bell Laboratories from 1974 to 1976, and at the RAND Corporation from 1976 to 1982, also holding a position as consulting assistant professor in psychology at the University of California, Los Angeles. She became a senior research scientist and lecturer at Stanford in 1982.

== Selected publications ==
A.	Thorndyke, Perry W.; Hayes-Roth, Barbara (January 1979), "The use of schemata in the acquisition and transfer of knowledge", Cognitive Psychology, 11 (1): 82–106, doi:10.1016/0010-0285(79)90005-7, S2CID 54373367

B.	Hayes-Roth, Barbara; Hayes-Roth, Frederick (October 1979), "A cognitive model of planning", Cognitive Science, 3 (4): 275–310, doi:10.1016/s0364-0213(79)80010-5 (inactive 1 February 2026)

C.	Thorndyke, Perry W.; Hayes-Roth, Barbara (October 1982), "Differences in spatial knowledge acquired from maps and navigation", Cognitive Psychology, 14 (4): 560–589, doi:10.1016/0010-0285(82)90019-6, PMID 7140211, S2CID 16880119

D.	Hayes-Roth, Barbara (July 1985), "A blackboard architecture for control", Artificial Intelligence, 26 (3): 251–321, doi:10.1016/0004-3702(85)90063-3

E.	Hayes-Roth, Barbara (May 1990), "Architectural foundations for real-time performance in intelligent agents", The Journal of Real Time Systems, 2 (1–2), Kluwer Academic Publishers: 99–125, Bibcode:1990RTSys...2...99H, doi:10.1007/bf01840468, S2CID 15768756

F.	Hayes-Roth, Barbara (January 1995), "An architecture for adaptive intelligent systems", Artificial Intelligence, 72 (1–2): 329–365, doi:10.1016/0004-3702(94)00004-k, hdl:2060/19970037819

G.	Hayes-Roth, Barbara; van Gent, Robert; Huber, Daniel (March 1997), "Acting in character", in Trappl, Robert; Petta, Paolo (eds.), Creating Personalities for Synthetic Actors: Towards Autonomous Personality Agents, Lecture Notes in Computer Science, vol. 1195, Springer, pp. 92–112, doi:10.1007/bfb0030573, ISBN 978-3-540-62735-7, S2CID 16942371

== Fiction writing ==
In addition to her many publications as a computer science researcher, Hayes-Roth is working on a fiction novel, The Ravishing Monica B. Reddy. An excerpt from the novel, Devesh Reddy, D-Day, was published in a 2020 issue of Chicago Quarterly Review. The novel is set in early 21st century Silicon Valley. In the excerpt, the titular character, Monica B. Reddy, is an Oracle executive in her forties who has just left her home to meet with her boss. Due to sexual frustrations in the marriage, Monica's husband Devesh suspects she may be having an affair.

== Recognition ==
Hayes-Roth was named a Fellow of the Association for the Advancement of Artificial Intelligence in 1991.
