= Screen (VR poem) =

2003 literary work for virtual reality CAVE

- Author: Josh Carroll, Noah Wardrip-Fruin, Robert Coover, Shawn Greenlee
- Language: English
- Publisher: Electronic Literature Organization
- Publication date: 2003

Screen is a work of electronic literature by Noah Wardrip-Fruin, Andrew McClain, Shawn Greenlee, Robert Coover, Josh Carroll and Sascha Becker. It was created in 2003 for Brown University's immersive virtual-reality chamber, also known as a VR CAVE. Screen was first presented at the 2003 Cyberarts Festival. Video documentation of the work is included in the Electronic Literature Collection volume 2.

== About the work ==
Screen was developed as part of a digital writing class at Brown University led by the novelist Robert Coover. To experience the work, readers would put on 3d glasses and step inside the CAVE, which was a small square room with projections on each of the walls. Screen began with a text about a memory being projected on each of the walls at the same time as it was read aloud. After a short pause, words begin to peel off the walls and fall down. The reader or interlocutor can hit the words back up onto the wall, in a sense reassembling the collapsing memories, but after a while, the words fall too fast for the reader to hit them back, and eventually they all fall to the floor. At this point, a male voice reads the conclusing words:

We stare into the white void of lost memories, a loose scatter about us of what fragments remain: no sense but nonsense to be found there. If memories define us, what defines us when they're gone? An unbearable prospect. We retrieve what we can and try again.

Noah Wardrip-Fruin called Screen an "instrumental text", as it was designed not only to be read but to be played, but as there was no clear winning condition the playing was more akin to playing an instrument than playing a game.

== Reception ==
Screen has been analyzed by many scholars. The close connection between the theme of the loss of memory and the interactive experience of the reader has been emphasized. Koskimaa analyses the temporarily of the work in his 2015 article on it.
