= Casey Muratori =

American computer programmer and game developer

- Born: 1976 (age 49–50)
- Occupation: Programmer
- Organization: Molly Rocket
- Known for: Bink Video; Granny 3D; immediate mode GUI (IMGUI); Handmade Hero

Casey Muratori (born 1976) is an American computer programmer and game developer. He is known for his work on Bink Video and Granny 3D while working at RAD Game Tools, for popularizing the concept of immediate mode GUI (IMGUI) and coining the term, and for the Handmade Hero series of educational videos.

== Early life ==
Muratori was raised near Framingham, Massachusetts.

Muratori began programming at the age of 7 in the BASIC programming language. His father was a programmer at Digital Equipment Corporation and taught Muratori how to program. Muratori's father also got programming books for Muratori to learn from.

When Muratori was in high school, a childhood friend's father invited Muratori to be an intern at Microsoft. Muratori was interviewed and was accepted. At his internship, Muratori wrote a library to load and show ANI files for mouse cursors, as well as making 3D art using 3D Studio for a different project. During his internship he also met Chris Hecker and became friends with him. Hecker invited Muratori to work with him at his startup after high school, which Muratori did instead of attending university. (He did apply to Brown University and was accepted, but moved to Washington state instead to work with Hecker.) At Hecker's startup, Muratori worked with Hecker, Jon Blossom, and Jon Ross on a game that did not ship. Muratori then worked at Gas Powered Games for a while before moving on to RAD Game Tools.

== Career ==
Starting in 1999, Muratori worked for about five years at RAD Game Tools (now part of Epic Games, having been acquired in 2021), a company developing middleware for the video game industry. At RAD Game Tools, Muratori initially worked on Larrabee. He then worked on Bink 2, a video compression program which video games use to render cutscenes. Bink has been used in over 15,000 games as of 2012. He also developed an internal debugging tool named Moustache as well as a 3D character animation system called Granny.

In 2005, he recorded a video lecture which coined the term immediate mode GUI (IMGUI) and popularized the concept. Immediate mode GUI is contrasted with the more mainstream object-oriented "retained mode" GUI frameworks such as Qt. For a time, he hosted a forum to discuss the subject. Besides immediate mode GUIs, he also developed the n-way linear quaternion blend and the first geometric optimizations for the Gilbert–Johnson–Keerthi (GJK) algorithm.

After leaving RAD Game Tools, Muratori started his own game development studio, Molly Rocket, in 2004. At Molly Rocket he spent 3.5 years as the sole developer of a video game, Sushi Bar Samurai, "a game about making sushi for ghosts caught between worlds". A demo of the game was playable at PAX 2008. Muratori decided not to release the game because "[i]t doesn't really communicate anything."

Muratori published a novel, The Technician, in 2011. He planned to release another novel, Three Stars, in 2012, but the book was never published.

From around 2012 to 2016, Muratori worked on Jonathan Blow's video game The Witness, where he rewrote the movement system (in particular, working on collision detection systems) and helped to extend the world editor. He documented his development progress in a series called Witness Wednesdays.

In 2014, Muratori began a video series entitled Handmade Hero, whose goal was to show the creation of an entire video game from scratch. The videos were live-streamed on Twitch and archives were uploaded to YouTube. As of 2025, the series has over 660 episodes, each one 1–3 hours long. The series spawned the Handmade Network and Handmade Cities, two communities of programmers and software projects that were inspired by Handmade Hero. Muratori also held conferences called HandmadeCon.

As of 2016, he was also working on 1935, a narrative-driven game set in 1930s New York about organized crime.

In 2020, Muratori announced an upcoming programming course focused on "fundamentals that apply to all programs in all languages" called Star Code Galaxy. As of 2025, Star Code Galaxy has not been released.

In 2023, Muratori began teaching an online course called Performance-Aware Programming.

He has spoken at various conferences including a keynote talk, "Digital Due Process", at FUTO's Don't Be Evil Summit in 2024, and the Better Software Conference 2025.

== Personal life ==
As of 2025, Muratori resides in Seattle, Washington.

From 2008 to 2020, Muratori co-hosted a podcast called the Jeff and Casey Show with RAD Game Tools founder Jeff Roberts.

He composes music on the piano.

== Works ==
=== Video games ===
Year	Title	Role	Ref.
2016	The Witness	Additional contributions in programming	
2024	Braid: Anniversary Edition	Interviews	

=== Books ===
Year	Title	Role	Ref.
2011	The Technician	Author	
2020	Meow the Infinite	Author and/or illustrator	
2022	Meow the Infinite: Book Two	Author and/or illustrator	
