= Interactive storytelling =

Digital entertainment in which the storyline is not predetermined

Interactive storytelling is a form of digital entertainment in which the storyline is not predetermined. The author creates the setting, characters, and situation which the narrative must address, but the user (also reader or player) experiences a unique story based on their interactions with the story world. The architecture of an interactive storytelling program includes a drama manager, user model, and agent model to control, respectively, aspects of narrative production, player uniqueness, and character knowledge and behavior. Together, these systems generate characters that act "human," alter the world in real-time reactions to the player, and ensure that new narrative events unfold comprehensibly.

The field of study surrounding interactive storytelling encompasses many disparate fields, including psychology, sociology, cognitive science, linguistics, natural language processing, user interface design, computer science, and emergent intelligence. They fall under the umbrella term of Human-Computer Interaction (HCI), at the intersection of hard science and the humanities. The difficulty of producing an effective interactive storytelling system is attributed to the ideological division between professionals in each field: artists have trouble constraining themselves to logical and linear systems and programmers are disinclined to appreciate or incorporate the abstract and unproven concepts of the humanities.

== Definition ==
What characteristics distinguish an interactive story from another form of interactive media is subject to much debate. Interactivity and storytelling are both polysemic terms, and the phrase "interactive storytelling" does not inherently distinguish it from other kinds of storytelling, many of which are already interactive to some extent. Some of the literature associated with the term "interactive storytelling" is actually about transmedia storytelling, which is not a form of entertainment, but a marketing strategy for building a compelling brand across digital platforms. Varying levels of interactivity are a function of the "relatedness of transmitted messages with previous exchanges of information where sender and receiver roles become interchangeable." Storytelling, in this case, refers to the process of active creation and authoring rather than the final product and its passive reception. Interactive storytelling by this definition can entail any media that allows the user to generate several unique dramatic narratives. Though its final goal is a fully unauthored AI environment with a comprehensive human-level understanding of narrative construction (e.g., the Holodeck), projects that use branching stories and variable gates are considered experimental prototypes in the same genre.

Interactive storytelling is defined as distinct from interactive fiction (or IF), as well as video games with strong narrative focus (Mass Effect, BioShock, etc.), by user agency and open-ended narrative. David Gaider, an RPG developer at BioWare, stated that "every possible branch needs to be written and fully realized, even if not every player sees it, and thus any game which allows for a lot of player choice becomes a much more expensive proposition for a developer." IF and video games, to balance user choice with authorial effort, must constrain the directions the narrative can take with puzzles, battles, or unchangeable plot points and bottlenecks, all of which detract from a sense of immersion. Only the most critical of the user's narrative choices are used or remembered in narrative development, according to the need to fulfill specific player goals that define a "gameplay" experience A true IS system would incorporate all of them, as do living human agents, simultaneously and continuously - a task only artificial intelligence can meet. Sandbox games like The Sims and Spore, which do involve extensive AI-based social interaction, do not manage dramatic tension or produce a cohesive narrative.

To Mateas and Stern, creators of Façade and The Party, interactive storytelling is best understood as interactive theater, in that its goal is dramatic meaning rather than fun. It was Chris Crawford who coined the term interactive storytelling in the 1990s, arguing that IS is not a video game with a narrative, and that a game and IS cannot be combined successfully. Because of limited technology and the amount of work required, it is still difficult to combine a robust interactive storytelling system and a game engine without detracting from the effectiveness of both.

Emerging voices in the field, however, argue for the possibilities of adding narrative complexity and realistic characters to existing video game genres. Using MADE (Massive Artificial Drama Engine), a team of AI researchers developed a genetic algorithm to guide emergent behavior for secondary non-player characters (NPCs) based on literary archetypes. In the AI engine of The Elder Scrolls V: Skyrim, this was tested to elaborate on the mechanistic behavior of townspeople:

...hungry inhabitants could become thieves, guards could pursue the thieves, villagers could fall in love with others, or different war alliances could emerge.

— García-Ortega et al., My life as a sim: evolving unique and engaging life stories using virtual worlds, 2014

== History ==
Early attempts to understand interactive storytelling date back to the 1970s with such efforts as Roger Schank's research at Northwestern University and the experimental program TaleSpin. In the early 1980s Michael Liebowitz developed "Universe", a conceptual system for a kind of interactive storytelling. In 1986, Brenda Laurel published her PhD dissertation, "Toward the Design of a Computer-Based Interactive Fantasy System."

During the 1990s, a number of research projects began to appear, such as the Oz Project led by Dr. Joseph Bates and Carnegie Mellon University, the Software Agents group at Massachusetts Institute of Technology, the Improv Project led by Ken Perlin at New York University, and the Virtual Theater group at Stanford, led by Barbara Hayes-Roth.

There were also a number of conferences touching upon these subjects, such as the Workshop on Interactive Fiction & Synthetic Realities in 1990; Interactive Story Systems: Plot & Character at Stanford in 1995; the AAAI Workshop on AI and Entertainment, 1996; Lifelike Computer Characters, Snowbird, Utah, October 1996; the First International Conference on Autonomous Agents at Marina del Rey, CA. February 5–8, 1997.

The first conference to directly address the research area was the 1st International Conference on Technologies for Interactive Digital Storytelling and Entertainment, which took place in March 2003 and focused specifically on concepts and first prototypes for automated storytelling and autonomous characters, including modeling of emotions and the user experience. The concepts were developed by Chris Crawford, in his 2005 book.

In the 2000s, work on interactive storytelling and related topics expanded, and was presented at events including the alternating bi-yearly conferences, TIDSE (Conference on Technologies for Interactive Digital Storytelling and Entertainment) and ICVS (International Conference on Virtual Storytelling), hosted in Germany and France, respectively. TIDSE and ICVS were superseded by ICIDS (International Conference on Interactive Digital Storytelling), a yearly event established in 2008.

The first published interactive storytelling software that was widely recognized as the "real thing" was Façade, created by Michael Mateas and Andrew Stern. The system was publicly released in 2006, and was the winner of the Grand Jury Prize at the 2006 Slamdance Independent Games Festival.

== Strategies ==
The architecture of an interactive storytelling system has three component parts: a drama manager, a user model, and an agent model. The drama manager is responsible for guiding the narrative by searching and executing story "beats" in a coherent sequence, refining story events by providing new information and reconciling contradictory plots, and collaborating with the agent model to choose the best narrative actions for the characters. It monitors a number of overview variables in the storyworld to make the best decision for the narrative, defined by the goals of the author: a measure of worldwide conflict would help to increase or decrease dramatic tension, while measures of relationships and likability could guide a story towards a romantic storyline. The agent model collects information about the story world and characters and generates possible actions in response for each non-player character in the story. Possible actions are drawn from the personality and emotional model of the character, allowing each one to exhibit autonomous behavior with intelligent dramatic goals. Finally, the user model keeps track of player choices and inputs, such that the drama manager and agent model can cooperate with the way the user attempts to play rather than challenging or misunderstanding their decisions.

Crawford discusses three potential strategies for developing interactive storytelling systems. Firstly, environmental approaches are those which take an interactive system, such as a computer game, and encourage the actions of a user in such a way as to form a coherent plot. With a sufficiently complex system, emergent behavior may form story-like behavior regardless of the user's actions.

Secondly, data-driven strategies have a library of "story components" which are sufficiently general that they can be combined smoothly in response to a user's actions (or lack thereof). This approach has the advantage of being more general that the directed environmental approach, at the cost of a much larger initial investment.

Finally, language-based approaches require that the user and system share some, very limited, domain-specific language so that they can react to each other and the system can 'understand' a greater proportion of the users actions. Crawford suggests approaches that only use, for example, pictorial languages or restricted versions of English.

Planning-based systems can be integrated into any of the above approaches to ensure narrative cohesion. The system does this by anticipating potential holes in the plot and repairing them by introducing new information and events. Two such systems include Automated Story Director (ASD), which forms narrative repairs based on plot points predefined by the author, and Player-Specific Automated Storytelling (PAST), which chooses from several possible repairs according to the player's previous behaviors. PAST characterizes a player along five vectors of style based on Robin Laws' work on player types—fighter, power gamer, storyteller, method actor, and tactician—and may choose to solve a broken plot point for a fighter by adding a battle with a new character, or for a storyteller by adding new background information that justifies the break.

== Evaluation ==
The success of an interactive storytelling experience depends on a balanced dramatic structure and user agency. A dramatically interesting narrative experience is one that moderates tension between characters and events over time, such that conflicts arise logically and are not left without resolution. It must also differ noticeably on every "playthrough" as a function of the user's freedom to interact with characters and objects in the virtual world. This can be achieved to varying degrees of success by branching, emergent, character-driven, and plot-driven systems, but no existing system fully achieves a lifelike experience. AIs do not yet have a human grasp of the rules of drama and narrative, so existing interactive dramas produce a limited number of significantly different story outcomes, relative to the amount of labor required of the author.

There have been several attempts at formalizing an evaluation system for interactive dramas, despite the fact that all existing projects are still in experimental stages. Player agency and fun remain the primary concerns, though fun is often exchanged for more narrative-specific metrics, like "interestingness" and "suspense." Likert scales filled out by players create a rough quantitative picture of user experience, but leave out much of the subjective interpretation that lies behind complex human interactions.

Mehta et al. focused on conversation-centric systems to develop qualitative metrics for the user's successful engagements, instead of quantitative measures of "inappropriate utterances" (in which the AI misunderstands player input and responds nonsensically) and other technical failures. After a "breakdown" in conversation, how effectively the user incorporates it into the overall understanding of the characters and story depends on design features. In their study of Façade, some AI actor breakdowns include shallow semantic understanding, inverted meanings, and the timing of responses. Artificially intelligent agents have trouble translating ambiguous user input into the limited narrative meaning system, as when "sad" or "hurt" is interpreted only as a reference to clinical depression. Similarly, negative and positive user sentiments are often confused with one another, especially if a positive statement is preceded by disagreement with a negative one. This is exacerbated if a user cannot send a reply fast enough – their utterance is understood as referring to the most recent speaker, leading to unintended interactions. However, background information is referenced often enough for a player to invent narrative justifications for apparently strange behaviors, which most participants did.

== Projects ==
=== The Oz Project ===
The Oz Project was an attempt in the early 1990s to use intelligent agent technology to attack the challenges in IS. Its architecture included a simulated physical world, several characters, an interactor, a theory of presentation, and a drama manager. Users communicated with the system using either a text based or graphical interface.

=== Façade ===
Façade is an artificial-intelligence-based approach created by Michael Mateas and Andrew Stern. It was the winner of the Grand Jury Prize at the 2006 Slamdance Independent Games Festival and is recognized as the first true interactive storytelling software. It is text based and uses natural language processing and other artificial intelligence routines to direct the action.

=== HEFTI ===
The Hybrid Evolutionary-Fuzzy Time-based Interactive (HEFTI) storytelling system was produced at the University of Texas at Austin and uses genetic algorithms to recombine and evaluate story components generated from a set of story templates. Although Crawford described it as the "wrong approach to development systems [...] incomprehensible to the kind of creative talent needed for storytelling," it continues to be discussed as a research and approach and genetic algorithm continue to be considered a potential tool for use in the area.

=== Library of story traces ===
Figa and Tarau have used WordNet to build technologies useful to interactive storytelling. This approach defines 'story traces' as an abstract reduction (or skeleton) of a story, and 'story projection' as a fragment of a story that can be treated as a single dramatic building block. This work seeks to build up large repositories of narrative forms in such a way that these forms can later be combined.

=== Interactive narrative design ===
As defined by Stephen Dinehart, Interactive narrative design combines ludology, narratology and game design to form interactive entertainment development methodologies. Interactive entertainment experiences allow the player to witness data as navigable, participatory, and dramatic in real-time: “a narratological craft which focuses on the structuralist, or literary semiotic creation of stories." Interactive Narrative design seeks to accomplish this via viewer/user/player (VUP) navigated dataspaces.

Interactive narrative design focuses on creating meaningful participatory story experiences with interactive systems. The aim is to transport the player through play into the videogame (dataspace) using their visual and auditory senses. When interactive narrative design is successful, the VUP (viewer/user/player) believes that they are experiencing a story.

=== Generative web series ===
Tour-Réservoir is the first generative web series, conceived by French artist Jean Michel Bruyère and his collective LFKs. Launched in 2016, it was developed and realised in co-operation with Le Volcan - Scène nationale du Havre, 296 inhabitants from a suburb of the city of Le Havre in France and more than 100 local music groups.

The website platform offers an active visit through five media – radio, TV, book, series, music video. The users can choose among a wide range of material which topics, actress(es) and music they want to appear/listen to and they can edit their own episodes or music videos.

It was nominated at the Côté Court short film festival in Pantin (Paris) in the New Media category in 2017.

=== Summary table ===
Story possibilities are not precisely calculable, and are represented as orders, such that O(10) would be in the order of tens of stories, and O(1) would be fewer than 10 unique story possibilities.

System	Virtual world	Interaction with objects	Social interaction	Dramatic structure	Story possibilities
Oz	Simple graphics	Yes	Some	Plot graph	O(10)
Virtual Theater Project	Text	Some	Yes	Plot graph	O(1)
Façade	Simple graphics	Some	Some	Plot graph	O(10)
IDA	Simple graphics	No	Some	Plot graph	O(1)
SASCE	None	Some	Some	Plot graph	O(10)
U-DIRECTOR	Simple graphics	Some	Some	Bayesian networks	O(1)
PaSSAGE	Pixelart graphics	Yes	No	Plot graph	O(10)
IN-TALE	Graphics	Yes	Some	Plot graph	O(10)
Mimesis	Simple graphics	Yes	No	Plot graph	O(1)
NOLIST	Text	Yes	Some	Bayesian networks	O(∞)
GADIN	Text	Some	Yes	Planning and dilemmas	O(∞)
Erasmatron	Text	No	Yes	Dramatic interest rules and general patterns	O(10)
DEFACTO	Text and simple graphics	Some	Some	Dramatic interest rules and general patterns	O(10)
OPIATE	Simple graphics	Yes	Some	Proppian structures	O(10)
DED	Improbable (company)	Yes	Yes	Schemas and Bayesian networks	O(∞)
IDtension	Text	No	No	Planning and tasks	O(10)
I-Storytelling	Simple graphics	No	Some	Character HTNs	O(10)
BARDS	Virtual reality	No	Some	HSP	O(10)
FAtiMA	Simple graphics	No	Yes	Character goals and emergence	O(10)
MyAdventures	Text and simple graphics	Some	Yes	Plot graph	O(∞)

== See also ==
- Interactive media
- Narrative Structure: Interactive narration
- Interactive fiction
- Drama annotation
- Visual novel
- Ergodic literature
- Cybertext

== Bibliography ==
1. Arinbjarnar, Maria; Barber, Heather; Kudenko, Daniel (2009). A Critical Review of Interactive Drama Systems. Heslington, York, UK: Games Interactive Entertainment and Drama Group at York.
2. Bostan, Barbaros; Marsh, Tim (2012). "Fundamentals of interactive storytelling". Online Academic Journal of Information Technology. 3 (8).
3. Carr, Nicholas (December 2010). "Interactive storytelling: an oxymoron". Rough Type.
4. Chapple, Craig (December 2014). "Telling tales: the art of narrative in games". Develop.
5. Christensen, Louise (2006). "CoC Professor Wins Slamdance Gamemaker Competition". College of Computing. Georgia Institute of Technology.
6. Crawford, Chris (December 2012). Chris Crawford on Interactive Storytelling (2 ed.). Indianapolis, IN: New Riders Publishing. ISBN 978-0321864970.
7. Chris Crawford (2005). Chris Crawford on Interactive Storytelling. New Riders. ISBN 978-0-321-27890-6.
8. Crawford, Chris (Speaker) (2015). Crawford Lecture at ICIDS: Interactive Storytelling (Conference lecture). Copenhagen, Denmark: Chris Crawford.
9. Dinehart, Stephen (2009a). "Defining Interactive Narrative Design 2 – The Narrative Design Exploratorium". Narrativedesign.org. Archived from the original on 2011-02-27.
10. Dinehart, Stephen (2009b). "Features - Dramatic Play". Gamasutra.
11. Dinehart, Stephen E. (2009c). "What is Interactive Narrative Design? | The Narrative Design Explorer". Narrativedesign.org.
12. García-Ortega, R. H.; García-Sánchez, P.; Mora, A.; Merelo Guervós, J.J. (2014). "My Life as a Sim: Evolving Unique and Engaging Life Stories Using Virtual Worlds". Proc. The Fourteenth Conference on the Synthesis and Simulation of Living Systems. New York, NY.
13. Göbel, Stefan (2004). Proceedings of the 2nd Technologies for Interactive Digital Storytelling and Entertainment Second International Conference (TIDSE). Darmstadt, Germany.
14. "International Conference on Interactive Digital Storytelling".
15. Kelso, M; Weyrauch, p; Bates, J (1993). "Dramatic Presence". Presence: Teleoperators & Virtual Environments. 2 (1). MIT Press: 1–15. doi:10.1162/pres.1993.2.1.1. S2CID 16411913.
16. Laurel, B.K. (1986). "Toward The Design Of A Computer-Based Interactive Fantasy System (PhD dissertation)". Department of Theater, Ohio State University.
17. Magerko, Brian (2005). "Story Representation and Interactive Drama". First Artificial Intelligence and Interactive Digital Entertainment Conference. Marina Del Rey, California.
18. Mehta, Manish; Dow, Steven; Mateas, Michael; MacIntyre, Blair (2007). "Evaluating a conversation-centered interactive drama". Proceedings of the 6th international joint conference on Autonomous agents and multiagent systems. São Paulo, Brazil.
19. Mateas, Michael (1997). An Oz-Centric Review of Interactive Drama and Believable Agents. Pittsburgh, PA: Carnegie Mellon School of Computer Science.
20. Mateas, Michael; Stern, Andrew (2003). "Façade: An experiment in building a fully realized interactive drama" (PDF). Proceedings of the Game Developers Conference, Game Design track.
21. Meehan, James R. (1977). "TALE-SPIN, An Interactive Program that Writes Stories". Proceedings of the Fifth International Joint Conference on Artificial Intelligence. CiteSeerX 10.1.1.74.173.
22. "Oz Project Home Page". Carnegie Mellon School of Computer Science.
23. Ramirez, Alejandro; Bulitko, Vadim; Spetch, Marcia (2013). "Evaluating Planning-Based Experience Managers for Agency and Fun in Text-Based Interactive Narrative". Proceedings of the Ninth AAAI Conference on Artificial Intelligence and Interactive Digital Entertainment. Boston, MA.
24. Rauch, Jonathan (Nov 2006). "Sex, lies, and video games". The Atlantic. London. pp. 76–86.
25. Riedl, Mark; Bulitko, Vadim (2013). "Interactive Narrative: An Intelligent Systems Approach". AI Magazine. 34 (1). AAAI: 67. doi:10.1609/aimag.v34i1.2449.
26. Si, Mei; Marsella, Stacy; Reidl, Mark O. (2008). "Interactive Drama Authoring with Plot and Character: An Intelligent System that Fosters Creativity". Creative Intelligent Systems, Papers from the 2008 AAAI Spring Symposium. Stanford, CA.
27. Szilas, Nicolas (2005). The future of interactive drama. Macquarie University Department of Computing.
