= Rick Hayes-Roth =

American computer scientist and educator (born 1947)

Frederick Hayes-Roth
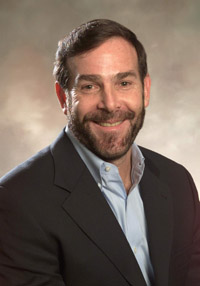
- Citizenship: U.S.
- Education: PhD - University of Michigan, 1974; MS - Univ. of Michigan, 1972; BA - Harvard University, 1969
- Known for: Co-inventor of the Hearsay-II speech understanding system and blackboard architecture; expert systems industrialization; VIRT (smart push); and the Maritime Information Exchange Model (MIEM)
- Awards: Fellow, American Association of Artificial Intelligence
- Scientific career
- Fields: Information sharing: architecture, ontologies, services, and trust; Valuable Information at the Right Time (VIRT) services; Model-based communication networks; Semantic web technologies
- Workplaces: Naval Postgraduate School, Singularity University, Stanford University, Carnegie-Mellon University, The University of Michigan, MIT
- Doctoral advisor: John Holland and Walter Reitman

Frederick Hayes-Roth (born 1947, né Frederick Roth) is an American computer scientist and educator. His principal work focuses on how to use computing processes to winnow data down to only those information items that are valuable to the receiver, using technology to deliver those items, and in designing IT systems structured for this task. Frederick Hayes-Roth is also known as Rick Roth and has published under the names Rick Hayes-Roth and Frederick Roth.

== Career ==
He was the Chief Technology Officer for Software at Hewlett-Packard from 2000 to 2001. Before that (1981–2000) he was chairman and chief executive of two Silicon Valley companies which he co-founded. One was Teknowledge Corporation, founded with Edward Feigenbaum.

He was the program director for research in Information Processing at the Rand Corporation from 1976 to 1981. That research program was prolific and influential, leading to numerous systems and research paradigms, including the Opportunistic Model of Planning (one of the 10 most cited papers in Cognitive Science), the rule-based system ROSIE, a number of heuristic expert systems, Distributed Fleet Control, and methods for non-monotonic reasoning and learning in knowledge networks.

Prior to that (1976), was one of the co-inventors of the first continuous speech understanding systems, Hearsay-II, which became the “blackboard architecture.”

Hayes-Roth held faculty positions at MIT, Stanford, and Carnegie Mellon. In 2003 he became a professor in the Information Sciences Department at the United States Navy's Naval Postgraduate School (NPS) in Monterey, California. At NPS he has taught hundreds of mid-career leaders in DOD through his "capstone course" on IT Strategy and Policy at NPS. The focus of that course has been on ways to radically improve the success of DOD IT system efforts.

In 2011, Hayes-Roth co-founded Truth Seal Corporation, a non-profit, in a response to the glut of information that makes it difficult to judge the veracity of information.

He is a Fellow of the Association for the Advancement of Artificial Intelligence, which cited him as follows:

For leadership in commercialization of expert system technology; for the co-development of Hearsay II and opportunistic-planning; and for the technical management of ROSIE, M.1, S.1, and ABE.

Hayes-Roth is also a senior member of the IEEE and a member of the Association for Computing Machinery.
