= OpenGL Performer =

OpenGL Performer, formerly known as IRIS Performer and commonly referred to simply as Performer, is an application development environment. It is a commercial library of utility code built on top of OpenGL for the purpose of enabling hard real-time visual simulation applications. OpenGL Performer was developed by SGI. OpenGL Performer is available for IRIX, Linux, and several versions of Microsoft Windows. Both ANSI C and C++ bindings are available.

== History ==
Performer came about in 1991 when a group from SGI's Open Inventor project, then known as IRIS Inventor, decided to focus on performance rather than ease of programmability. Whereas Inventor delivered easy-to-use objects and various UI elements to interact with them, Performer focused on a scene graph system that could be re-arranged on the fly for performance reasons, allowing the various passes of a rendering task to be performed in parallel in multiple threads. Performer allowed the scene to describe levels of detail with hysteresis bands and fade capabilities. Frame rate and statistics were monitored and a 'stress' factor was calculated. This could be used to further weight the level of detail in the scene eliminating detail to maintain a target frame rate.

Other key features of Performer were the use of symmetric multi-processing capabilities, support multiple graphics pipes and the ability to utilize the scalable resources of high end systems. In this regard Performer was actually simple to use given the underlying complexity. Application culling and rendering could be running in different threads locked to different physical processors. In a multi-pipe (multiple graphics subsystems) configuration rendering to each graphics pipe would have a dedicated thread and similarly culling would also have a dedicated processor. Advanced features like database paging, texture paging and point light source management (for flight simulation) and intersection testing for collision detection would also have dedicated processors allowing asynchronous I/O and processing to occur without negatively impacting graphics performance. Most of this complexity was hidden beneath a simpler scene graph API with relatively high level configuration calls which could be made to set up the threads and inter-process communication.

Performer did not have a native file format, merely plugin loaders from 3rd parties such as MultiGen's OpenFlight format loader. Similarly there was no default runtime, there was sample code and the often used and often modified 'perfly' sample application. This probably contributed to its reputation for being difficult to use.

By the mid-1990s it started to become clear that there was no reason that Inventor and Performer could not be combined. This led to the Cosmo 3D project that SGI was intending to build both Inventor and Performer (now essentially API shims) out of, as well as promote as a new and higher-level standardized API for future work on the SGI platform. However, after the first beta release of Cosmo 3D, SGI joined with Intel and IBM (and later DEC) to create OpenGL++, essentially a cleaned up version of Cosmo. This project died when SGI turned their attention to an almost identical project with Microsoft known as Fahrenheit, which was also killed. Today Inventor and Performer remain separate products, and none of the combined versions ever saw the light of day.

== Features ==
Performer consists primarily of two libraries: the lower-level libpr and the higher-level libpf. The libpr library provides an object-oriented interface to high-speed rendering functions based on the concept of a pfGeoSet and a pfGeoState. A pfGeoSet is a collection of graphics primitives, such as polygons or lines. A pfGeoState encapsulates properties pertaining to a given pfGeoSet such as lighting, transparency, and texturing.

The libpf library includes functions for the generation and manipulation of hierarchical scene graphs, scene processing (simulation, intersection, culling, and drawing tasks), level-of-detail management, asynchronous database paging, dynamic coordinate systems, environment models, light points, and so on. This library also provides transparent support for multiple viewports spread across multiple graphics pipelines.

Other Performer libraries--libpfutil, libpfdb, libpfui, etc.--provide functions for generating optimized geometry, database conversion, device input (such as for interfacing with external flyboxes and MIL-STD-1553 mux busses), motion models, collision models, and a format-independent database interface that supports common data formats such as Open Inventor, OpenFlight, Designer's Workbench, Medit, and Wavefront .obj file.
