= Nick Montfort =

American poet & digital media professor

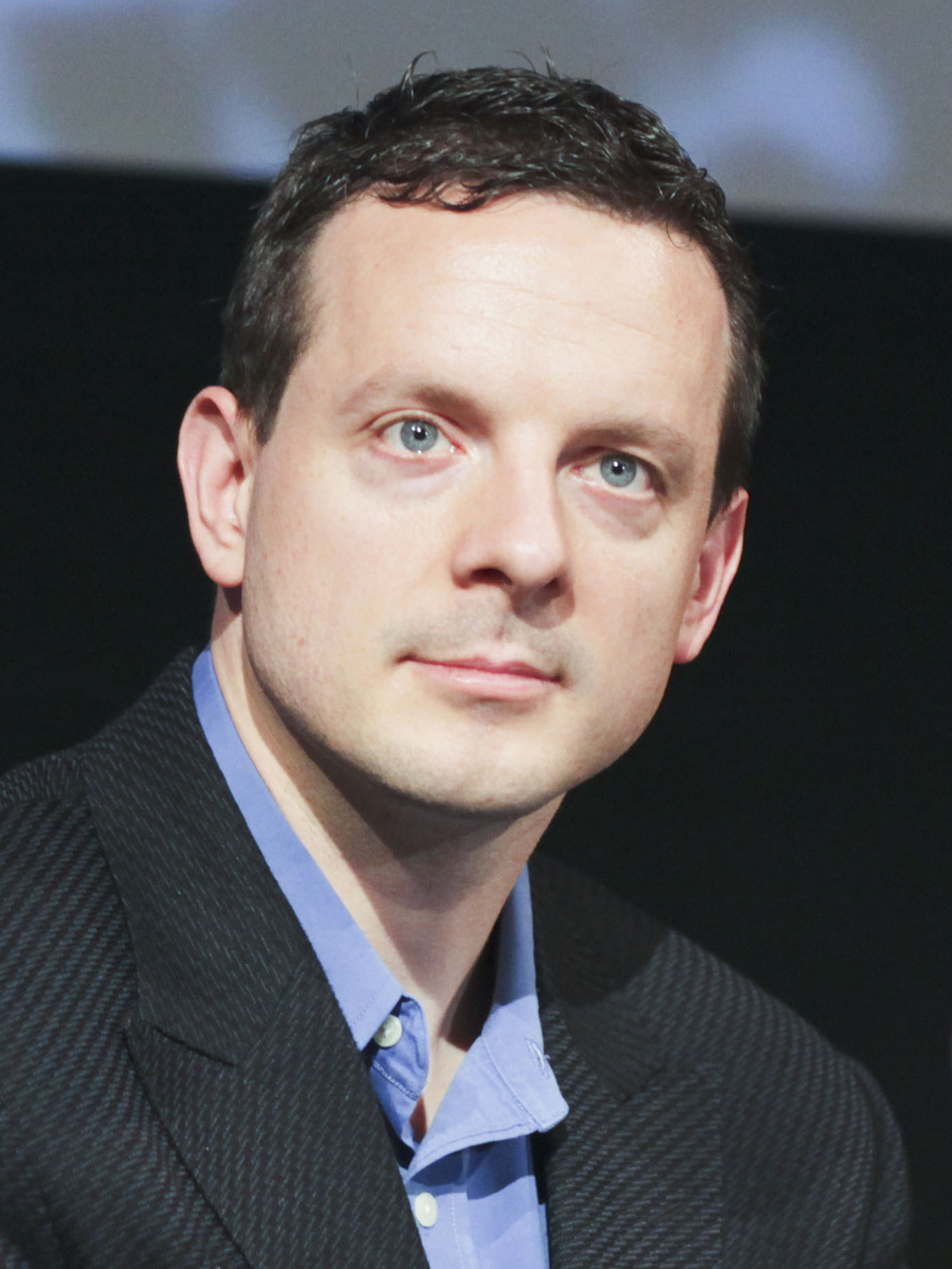
- Montfort in 2010
- Born: Nicholas Montfort
- Known for: Poetry, Interactive Fiction, Electronic literature
- Notable work: The Future, #!, Grand Text Auto, Twisty Little Passages, The Electronic Literature Collection: Volume 1, The New Media Reader

Nick Montfort is an American computer scientist and poet who is a professor of digital media at Massachusetts Institute of Technology, where he directs a lab called The Trope Tank. He also holds a part-time position at the University of Bergen where he leads a node on computational narrative systems at the Center for Digital Narrative. Among his publications are seven books of computer-generated literature and six books from the MIT Press, several of which are collaborations. His work also includes digital projects, many of them in the form of short programs. He lives in New York City.

== Computer-generated books ==
Montfort's The Truelist (Counterpath, 2017) is a computer-generated book-length poem produced by a one-page computer program. The code is included at the end of the book. Montfort has also done a complete studio recording reading The Truelist, available at PennSound.

Among Montfort's computer-generated books is #! (pronounced "shebang"), in which he "chooses the programming languages Python, Ruby, and Perl (the last of which has a documented history as a poetic medium) to create impressions of an ideal—machines based on the rules of language." The book includes a Python version of "Taroko Gorge," which is available online in JavaScript and has been modified by many authors. Some of these "remixes" are collected in The Electronic Literature Collection: Volume 3.

Montfort collaborated with six others on 2x6, a book published by Les Figues that includes six short programs and some of the short narrative poems these generate in English, Spanish, French, Polish, Japanese, and Russian. This project has also been exhibited and is available online on the Web. Montfort's Autopia, which assembles short sentences from the names of automobiles, is another project that also appears as a printed book (published by Troll Thread), a gallery installation, and a web page. These and other of his computer-generated books have been considered conceptual writing.

Several of Montfort's printed computer-generated books were generated with programs he wrote during National Novel Generation Month (NaNoGenMo). These include three self-published books, Hard West Turn (2018 Edition), Megawatt, and World Clock, written during the first NaNoGenMo in 2014. Translations of two of these were published by presses in Europe: World Clock was published in Polish translation by ha!art, and Megawatt in German translation by Frohmann.

Montfort is the founder and series editor of Using Electricity, a series of computer-generated books published by Counterpath.

In November 2019 Montfort announced "Nano-NaNoGenMo," calling for short computer programs within that year's National Novel Generation Month. His request was that people write programs of 256 characters or less to generate novels of 50,000 words or more. He contributed several such programs himself, as did several others.

== Poetry ==
Montfort's poetry, in addition to computer-generated books and projects, includes digital poems that are collaborations with others. He, Amaranth Borsuk and Jesper Juul wrote The Deletionist, a system for generating erasure poetry from any page on the web. With Stephanie Strickland he wrote Sea and Spar Between, a generator of about 225 trillion stanzas arranged in a grid and combining language from Herman Melville's Moby Dick and Emily Dickinson's poems. Montfort and William Gillespie wrote 2002: A Palindrome Story, a 2002-word narrative palindrome published in 2002 in print and on the web.

Riddle & Bind (Spineless Books, 2010), Montfort's first book of poetry, is a collection of poems written under constraint and literary riddles.

== Interactive fiction ==
Montfort has written about interactive fiction and written several interactive fiction games. Book and Volume (2005) was a finalist in the 2007 Slamdance Guerilla Gamemaker Competition. However, after Super Columbine Massacre RPG!, which had also been named a finalist, was excluded from the festival, Montfort withdrew from the competition in protest.

Released in 2000, Ad Verbum is a wordplay-based game in which the player has to figure out stylistic constraints in different locations and type certain commands in order to solve puzzles. It received the 2000 XYZZY Award for Best Puzzles.

Twisty Little Passages: An Approach to Interactive Fiction, a 2003 book, was described by Steve Meretzky as "a thoroughly researched history of interactive fiction, as well as a brilliant analysis of the genre."

== Writing on digital media ==
The group blog Grand Text Auto, active in the early 2000s, was one site where Montfort wrote with others about digital media. Montfort wrote Twisty Little Passages: An Approach to Interactive Fiction (MIT Press, 2003) and co-edited The Electronic Literature Collection: Volume 1 (ELO, 2006) and The New Media Reader (MIT Press, 2003) during that time.

Montfort and Georgia Institute of Technology professor Ian Bogost wrote Racing the Beam: The Atari Video Computer System (MIT Press, 2009), a study of world's first widespread gaming system, the Atari 2600. In the book, they analyze the platforms, or systems, that underlie the computing process. They also discuss the social and cultural implications of the system that dominated the video game market.. Montfort along with nine other co-authors wrote 10 PRINT CHR$(205.5+RND(1)); : GOTO 10 (MIT Press, 2012), or simply 10 PRINT, a study of the titular one-line BASIC program for the Commodore 64. Using the program as a template, 10 Print addresses the cultural phenomenon of computer programs, the randomness and regularity in computing and art and the maze in popular culture.

His most recent book is The Future (MIT Press, 2017). A futures studies reviewer describes The Future as "written by an outsider to the foresight community" who "examines the works of artists, inventors, and designers and how they have imagined the future." The book was reviewed as "striking a balance between planning and poetry ... a sober, tight account of what 'the future' is and has been, as well as how to think and make it."

== Works ==
=== Poetry ===
- The Truelist (2017), also in print, Counterpath
- Autopia (2016), also in print, Troll Thread
- 2x6 (collaboration with six others, 2016), also in print, Les Figues
- Taroko Gorge (2009)
- Ream/Rame (collaboration with Anick Bergeron, 2008)
- 2002: A Palindrome Story (collaboration with William Gillespie, 2002), also in print, Spineless Books

=== Prose ===
- Grand Text Auto group blog
- Book and Volume (2005)
- Implementation (collaboration with Scott Rettberg, 2004)
- Ad Verbum (2000)
- Winchester's Nightmare (1999)

=== In print ===
- Montfort, Nick (2017). The Future. Cambridge, MA: MIT Press.
- Montfort, Nick (2016). Exploratory Programming for the Arts and Humanities. Cambridge, MA: MIT Press.
- Montfort, Nick; Patsy Baudoin; John Bell; Ian Bogost; Jeremy Douglass; Mark C. Marino; Michael Mateas; Casey Reas; Mark Sample; Noah Vawter (2012). 10 PRINT CHR$(205.5+RND(1)); : GOTO 10. MIT Press.
- Montfort, Nick, and Ian Bogost (2009). Racing the Beam: The Atari Video Computer System. Cambridge, MA: MIT Press.
- Montfort, Nick (2003). Twisty Little Passages: An Approach to Interactive Fiction. Cambridge, MA: MIT Press.
- Montfort, Nick; Noah Wardrip-Fruin (2003). The New Media Reader. Cambridge, MA: MIT Press.
