= New media studies =

Academic discipline

New media studies is an academic discipline that explores the intersections of computing, science, the humanities, and the visual and performing arts. Janet Murray, a prominent researcher in the discipline, describes this intersection as "a single new medium of representation, the digital medium, formed by the braided interplay of technical invention and cultural expression at the end of the 20th century". The main factor in defining new media is the role the Internet plays; new media is effortlessly spread instantly. The category of new media is occupied by devices connected to the Internet, an example being a smartphone or tablet. Television and cinemas are commonly thought of as new media but are ruled out since the invention was before the time of the internet.

New media studies examines ideas and insights on media from communication theorists, programmers, educators, and technologists. Among others, the work of Marshall McLuhan is viewed as one of the cornerstones of the study of media theory. McLuhan’s slogan, "the medium is the message" (elaborated in his 1964 book, Understanding Media: The Extensions of Man), calls attention to the intrinsic effect of communications media.

A program in new media studies may incorporate lessons, classes, and topics within communication, journalism, computer science, programming, graphic design, web design, human-computer interaction, media theory, linguistics, information science, and other related fields.

New media studies is the academic discipline which examines how our relationship with media has changed with the onset of global connectivity and the popularity of digital and user-generated content. New media studies seeks to connect computer sciences and innovations in new media with social sciences and the philosophy of technology.

== History ==
=== Major figures ===
Marshall McLuhan is known in the study of media theory for coining the phrase, "the medium is the message" in its effect in communication in media. The medium affects how the media is delivered by the person and how the other person is receiving that media, while the characteristics of the medium effects the content in its delivery. McLuhan’s work challenged how media changed in the post-modern era which can also relate to present day use of media and its medium. Interface is defined as the common boundary of 2 bodies, spaces, or phases. Other Major works that also invoke his standpoint in the study of New Media including:

- The Mechanical Bride (1951) - Which includes many short essays that analyze forms of media such as advertising, or newspaper in relation to society.
- The Gutenberg Galaxy (1962) - In this book, McLuhan Writes about technology like the printing press or electronic media changing how people share stories in their day-to-day lives.

Lev Manovich has written nine books on the topic of new media. He developed a number of now-standard concepts for the analysis of new media culture such as cultural interface, database, navigable space, metamedia, and others. Manovich's 2001 book The Language of New Media contains the analysis of the five general principles of new media, as they developed up until that time:

- Numerical Representation: essentially means that "all new media objects can be described mathematically and can be manipulated via algorithms."
- Modularity: are "elements can that be independently modified and reused in other works".
- Automation: "Automation is seen in computer programs that allow users to create or modify media objects using templates or algorithms".
- Variability: is "a new media object is not something fixed once and for all, but something that can exist in different, potentially infinite versions".
- Transcoding: Designates the blend of computer and culture, of "traditional ways in which human culture modeled the world and the computer's own means of representing it".

Henry Jenkins introduced the convergence culture concept in the field of new media studies: "By convergence, I mean the flow of content across multiple media platforms, the cooperation between multiple media industries, and the migratory behavior of media audiences who would go almost anywhere in search of the kinds of entertainment experiences they wanted."

Janet Murray is a professor at the School of Literature, Media, and Communications at the Georgia Institute of Technology. Murray is also a part of several design projects such as; a digital edition of the Warner Brothers classic, Casablanca. Janet works exclusively as a member of Georgia Tech's experimental game lab. Janet is also the author of the book Hamlet on the Holodeck; The Future of Narrative in Cyberspace. Along with this book, she is also a guest writer in The New Media Reader, where she is credited for writing one of the two introductions in the book called, Inventing the Medium.

== Terminology ==
- Strategies vs Tactics - The term strategies refers to the methods a producer intended for their creation to be used. The term tactics is referring to the ways individuals actually utilize a creation, regardless of the creators intentions, in order to make it more useful to them.
- Hypermediated - Hypermediation is a concept in new media studies that refers to a form of mediation in which media is connected in a very close way. Mediation, in this sense, deals with using indirect sources to create a direct connection between different types of media. This process is often done by the use of hypertext and through the Networked approach to new media. An example of hypermediation would be an online shopper who buys a particular item, then in turn gets links to related items, then articles related to those items etc.
- Web 2.0 - Web 2.0 is the concept of websites geared toward content created by users. Web 2.0 allows the web to be used as a platform. It also enables the users to control their own data. Tim O'Reilly and Dale Dougherty invented the phrase Web 2.0 at the Media Conference in 2004. Some examples of Web 2.0 are Google AdSense, Flickr, BitTorrent, Napster and Wikipedia.
- Networking is a term that defines the transformation of old media to new media through communication that enables users to produce or compute material of their own on the internet. It's a medium that consists of blogs, emails, and social media networks which allows more global connections to reach many to share ideas.
- Commodification of Experience - The packaging of human experience in some form to be sold back to the consumer. This is a common term in study of the role new media plays. An example of the top-down ideal. Common examples include cable subscriptions, vacation resort packages, memberships and, more abstractly, one's presence on social media.
- Simulation is a term that can be defined as a virtual representation of reality. For example, according to New Media and Visual Culture, virtually, things seem real based on experience, but they are not real because they have not actually happened. French theorist, Jean Baudrillard, believed that simulation was the modern stage of simulacrum.
- Virtual - Lev Manovich describes a virtual world as an interactive world created by a computer that many people can access at one time. A virtual world is an interactive and digital space. Virtual worlds are often created as a simulation of something which already exists in the physical world.
