= Text shaping =

Process of converting text to glyph indices and positions

Text shaping is the process of converting text to glyph indices and positions as part of text rendering. It is complementary to font rendering as part of the text rendering process; font rendering is used to generate the glyphs, and text shaping decides which glyphs to render and where they should be put on the image plane. Unicode is generally used to specify the text to be rendered.

Text shaping results in substantially better results on Latin script; for some scripts with complex text layout such as Arabic script, text shaping is necessary for text to be readable at all.

Most graphical user interface systems, including those in macOS, iOS, and Microsoft Windows have their own native text rendering engines that include text shaping. Microsoft's Uniscribe framework permits the use of pluggable shaping engines. Monotype's WorldType system also provides shaping functions.

In the open source world, HarfBuzz is a popular text shaping engine. According to HarfBuzz's developers, HarfBuzz is used by a range of software products including Android, Chrome, ChromeOS, Firefox, GNOME, GTK+, KDE, Qt, LibreOffice, OpenJDK, XeTeX, PlayStation, Microsoft Edge, Adobe Photoshop, Illustrator, InDesign, and Godot Engine.

Text shaping engines require descriptions of shaping properties and rules packaged in a format known as a shaping model. Shaping models include OpenType Layout, Graphite, and Apple Advanced Typography.

== See also ==
- Font rasterization
- Kerning
- Ligature (typography)
- Layout engine
- Complex text layout
- Line wrap and word wrap
- Pagination
