= International Components for Unicode =

Software library

- Developer: Unicode Consortium
- Release: 1999
- Stable release: 78.3 / 17 March 2026; 7 months ago
- Written in: C/C++ (C++17) and Java 8+
- Operating system: Cross-platform
- Type: Libraries for Unicode and internationalization
- License: Unicode License
- Website: icu.unicode.org
- Repository: github.com/unicode-org/icu

International Components for Unicode (ICU) is an open-source project of mature C/C++ and Java libraries for Unicode support, software internationalization, and software globalization. ICU is widely portable to many operating systems and environments. It gives applications the same results on all platforms and between C, C++, and Java software. The ICU project is a technical committee of the Unicode Consortium and sponsored, supported, and used by IBM and many other companies. ICU has been included as a standard component with Microsoft Windows since Windows 10 version 1703.

ICU provides the following services: Unicode text handling, full character properties, and character set conversions; Unicode regular expressions; full Unicode sets; character, word, and line boundaries; language-sensitive collation and searching; normalization, upper and lowercase conversion, and script transliterations; comprehensive locale data and resource bundle architecture via the Common Locale Data Repository (CLDR); multiple calendars and time zones; and rule-based formatting and parsing of dates, times, numbers, currencies, and messages. ICU provided complex text layout service for Arabic, Hebrew, Indic, and Thai historically, but that was deprecated in version 54, and was completely removed in version 58 in favor of HarfBuzz.

ICU provides more extensive internationalization facilities than the standard libraries for C and C++. ICU requires C++17 (or C11) but pre-ICU 75 uses C++11 (or C99). ICU has historically used UTF-16, and still does only for Java; while for C/C++ UTF-8 is supported, including the correct handling of "illegal UTF-8".

ICU 73.2 has improved significant changes for GB18030-2022 compliance support, i.e. for Chinese (that updated Chinese GB18030 Unicode Transformation Format standard is slightly incompatible); has "a modified character conversion table, mapping some GB18030 characters to Unicode characters that were encoded after GB18030-2005" and has a number of other changes such as improving Japanese and Korean short-text line breaking, and in "English, the name “Türkiye” is now used for the country instead of “Turkey” (the alternate spelling is also available in the data)."

ICU 74 "updates to Unicode 15.1, including new characters, emoji, security mechanisms, and corresponding APIs and implementations. [..] ICU 74 and CLDR 44 are major releases, including a new version of Unicode and major locale data improvements." Of the many changes some are for person name formatting, or for improved language support, e.g. for Low German, and there's e.g. a new spoof checker API, following the (latest version) Unicode 15.1.0 UTS #39: Unicode Security Mechanism.

== Older version details ==
ICU 72 updated to Unicode 15 (and 73.2 to latest 15.1). "In many formatting patterns, ASCII spaces are replaced with Unicode spaces (e.g., a "thin space")." ICU (ICU4J) now requires Java 8 but "Most of the ICU 72 library code should still work with Java 7 / Android API level 21, but we no longer test with Java 7." ICU 71 added e.g. phrase-based line breaking for Japanese (earlier methods didn't work well for short Japanese text, such as in titles and headings) and support for Hindi written in Latin letters (hi_Latn), also referred to as "Hinglish". ICU 70 added e.g. support for emoji properties of strings and can now be built and used with C++20 compilers (and "ICU operator==() and operator!=() functions now return bool instead of UBool, as an adjustment for incompatible changes in C++20"), and as of that version the minimum Windows version is Windows 7. ICU 67 handles removal of Great Britain from the EU. ICU 64.2 added support for Unicode 12.1, i.e. the single new symbol for current Japanese Reiwa era (but support for it has also been backported to older ICU versions down to ICU 4.8.2). ICU 58 (with Unicode 9.0 support) is the last version to support older platforms such as Windows XP and Windows Vista. Support for AIX, Solaris and z/OS may also be limited in later versions (i.e. building depends on compiler support).

== Origin and development ==
After Taligent became part of IBM in early 1996, Sun Microsystems decided that the new Java language should have better support for internationalization. Since Taligent had experience with such technologies and were close geographically, their Text and International group were asked to contribute the international classes to the Java Development Kit as part of the JDK 1.1 internationalization APIs. A large portion of this code still exists in the java.text and java.util packages. Further internationalization features were added with each later release of Java.

The Java internationalization classes were then ported to C++ and C as part of a library known as ICU4C ("ICU for C"). The ICU project also provides ICU4J ("ICU for Java"), which adds features not present in the standard Java libraries. ICU4C and ICU4J are very similar, though not identical; for example, ICU4C includes a Regular Expression API, while ICU4J does not. Both frameworks have been enhanced over time to support new facilities and new features of Unicode and Common Locale Data Repository (CLDR).

ICU was released as an open-source project in 1999 under the name IBM Classes for Unicode. It was later renamed to International Components For Unicode. In May 2016, the ICU project joined the Unicode consortium as technical committee ICU-TC, and the library sources are now distributed under the Unicode license.

== MessageFormat ==
A part of ICU is the MessageFormat class, a formatting system that allows for any number of arguments to control the plural form (plural, selectordinal) or more general switch-case-style selection (select) for things like grammatical gender. These statements can be nested. ICU MessageFormat was created by adding the plural and selection system to an identically-named system in Java SE.

== Alternatives ==
An alternative for using ICU with C++, or to using it directly, is to use Boost.Locale, which is a C++ wrapper for ICU (while also allowing other backends). The claim for using it rather than ICU directly is that "is absolutely unfriendly to C++ developers. It ignores popular C++ idioms (the STL, RTTI, exceptions, etc), instead mostly mimicking the Java API." Another claim, that ICU only supports UTF-16 (and thus a reason to avoid using ICU) is no longer true with ICU now also supporting UTF-8 for C and C++.

== See also ==
- Apple Advanced Typography
- Apple Type Services for Unicode Imaging
- gettext
- Graphite (smart font technology)
- NetRexx (ICU license)
- OpenType
- Pango
- Uconv
- Uniscribe
