= PageSpinner =

- Developer: Optima-system
- Stable release: 5.2.1
- Written in: C
- Operating system: OS X
- Type: HTML editor
- License: Proprietary
- Website: www.optima-system.com/pagespinner/

PageSpinner was a semi-WYSIWYG HTML editor for Macintosh operating systems. It was originally released for Classic Mac OS but was ported to OS X shortly after that operating system's release. It was developed by Optima Systems in Sweden and released as shareware. PageSpinner is WorldScript compliant and uses the WASTE text engine and the Carbon library.

Version 1.0 of PageSpinner was available as shareware with the paid version costing $25 in 1996. It was noted for its popularity within NASA in 1998 as a part of the NASAlib shareware/freeware library.

Version 4.0, released in 2002, introduced multiple undo, double-byte input support, and scroll wheel support on Mac OS X.

Version 5 was released in 2010 and reviewed by MacWorld UK, which faulted its appearance for being dated, and found its price to be high for the features it provided, but the reviewer was impressed with its multiple site support and integration with Apache, OS X's standard web server.

As of June 2019, the Optima Systems website is offline and the current status of PageSpinner is unknown.

As of February 2020 the Optima Systems website links to an unwanted site not safe for office viewing.
