= Sketch recognition =

Sketch recognition describes the process by which a computer or artificial intelligence can interpret hand-drawn sketches, created by a human being or other machine. Sketch recognition is a key frontier in the field of artificial intelligence and human-computer interaction, similar to natural language processing or conversational artificial intelligence.

== Uses and Applications ==
Research in sketch recognition lies at the crossroads of artificial intelligence and human–computer interaction. Recognition algorithms usually are gesture-based, appearance-based, geometry-based, or a combination thereof.

Advances in the field of sketch recognition would have significant application in the field of forensic science, in which sketches are often used to identify suspects associated with a crime.

In 2023, two developers used OpenAI's DallE-2 image generation platform to create a forensic sketch program. The program's results were described as "hyper-realistic" and purported the potential of exponentially decreasing the creation time of a forensic sketch, while increasing accuracy.

Sketch recognition technology has also been linked to applications in the fields of architecture, videogame production, animation, construction, and academia, among others.

== See also ==
- Gesture recognition
- Handwriting recognition
- Human–computer interaction
- Multi-touch gestures
- Pen computing
- Sketch-based modeling
- Tablet computer
