= Skia Graphics Engine =

Open source graphics library written in C++

- Original author: Skia Inc.
- Developer: Google
- Written in: C++
- Operating system: Android, iOS, Linux, macOS, Windows
- Type: Graphics library
- License: New BSD License
- Website: skia.org
- Repository: skia.googlesource.com/skia

The Skia Graphics Engine or Skia is an open-source 2D graphics library written in C++. Skia abstracts away platform-specific graphics APIs (which differ from one to another). Skia Inc. originally developed the library; Google acquired it in 2005, and then released the software as open-source licensed under the New BSD free software license in 2008.

== Overview ==
In order to stay multi-platform, Skia supports several (platform-dependent) back-ends. These include:

- CPU software rasterization
- Portable Document Format (PDF) output
- GPU-accelerated rendering by using:
  - ANGLE backend, which translates OpenGL ES calls into vendor's native APIs
  - Vulkan and Metal.
- Scalable Vector Graphics (SVG)
- XML Paper Specification (XPS)

Skia is most similar in purpose to Cairo or Pathfinder (meaning that it focuses on drawing) rather than to other more elaborate APIs like that of Qt that provide their own widgets and UI description language etc.

== Application ==
The library has been in use as of 2023 in

- Google Chrome
- ChromeOS
- ChromiumOS
- Mozilla Firefox
- Mozilla Thunderbird
- Android
- Firefox OS
- Flutter (before version 3.47)
- Ladybird,
- Avalonia (from Alpha 4)
- LibreOffice (from version 7.0)
- RAD Studio(since version 12.0)
- Jetbrains Compose Multiplatform (forked as Skiko)
- Shopify React Native Skia

== Supported platforms ==
- Windows 10, 11
- macOS 10.15 or later
- iOS 12 or later
- Android 4.3 (JellyBean) or later
- Ubuntu 18.04+, Debian 10+, openSUSE 15.2+, or Fedora Linux 32+
- Web Browsers

== Etymology ==
Skia is a romanisation of the word 'shadow' in Greek (Σκιά).

== History ==
Skia Inc, developers of the Skia Graphics Engine, was founded in 2004 by Mike Reed and Cary Clark in Chapel Hill, North Carolina, before being acquired by Google in 2005.

== See also ==
- Direct2D
- Starling Framework
- Anti-Grain Geometry
- CoreGraphics
- Cairo
- QuickDraw GX
