= Behdad Esfahbod =

Iranian–Canadian software engineer (born 1982)

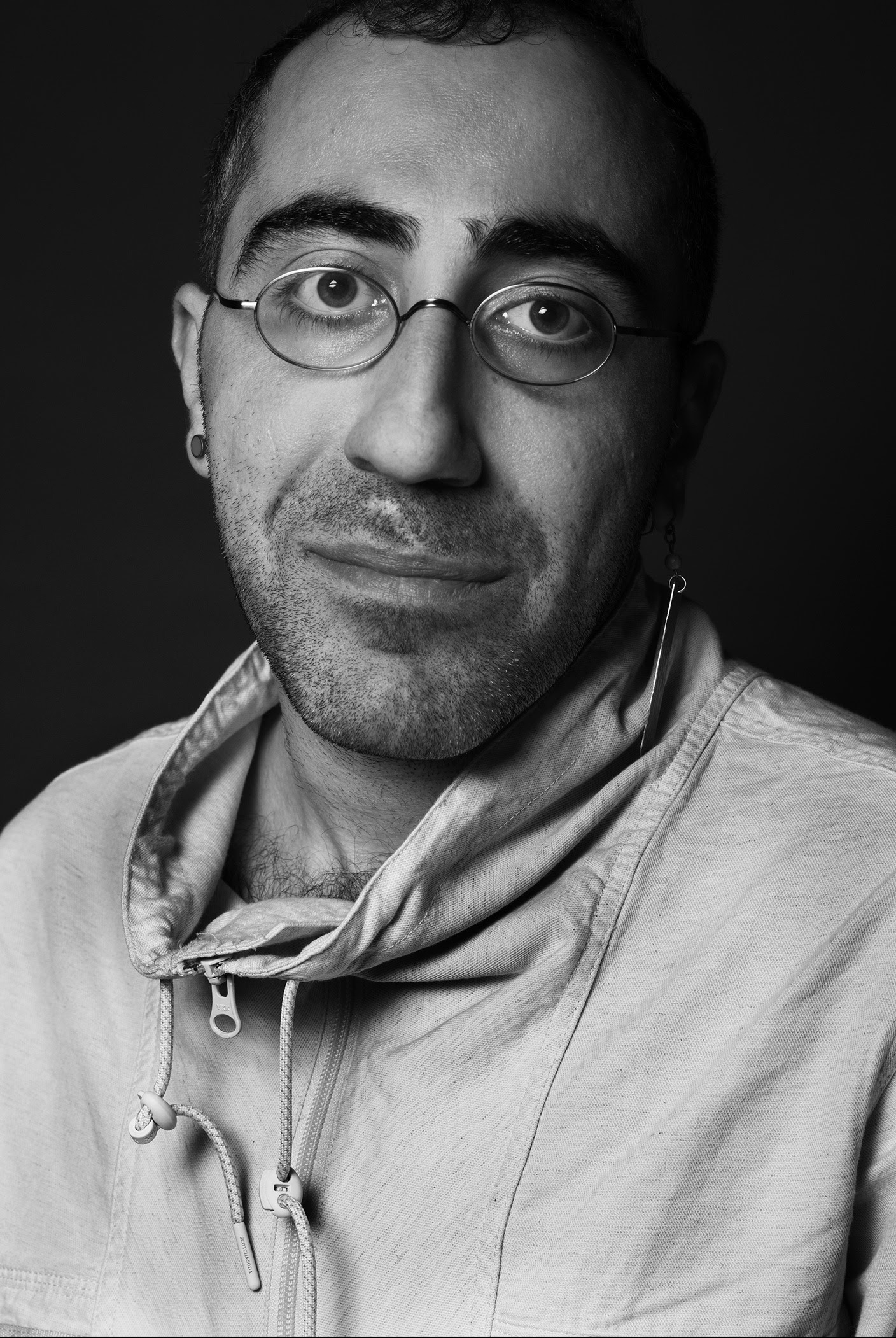
- Esfahbod in 2016
- Born: September 27, 1982 (age 44); Sari, Iran
- Education: University of Toronto, MBA (2012); University of Toronto, M.S. Computer Science (2006); Sharif University, B.S. Computer Engineering (2003)
- Occupation: Software engineer
- Employer(s): Meta; Google; Red Hat; GNOME; FarsiWeb
- Known for: HarfBuzz, Pango

Behdad Esfahbod (born Seyed Behdad Esfahbod MirHosseinZadeh Sarabi, Persian: سید بهداد اسفهبد میر حسین‌زاده سرابی, September 27, 1982) is an Iranian-Canadian software engineer and free software developer, best known for creating HarfBuzz. He was a software engineer at Facebook from February 2019 to July 2020, before which he was a Senior Staff Software Engineer at Google from 2010, and earlier at Red Hat.

== Education ==
Esfahbod holds an MBA from the Rotman School of Management at the University of Toronto, a Master of Science in Computer Science from the University of Toronto, and a Bachelor of Science in Computer Engineering from Sharif University of Technology.

While in high school, Esfahbod won a silver at the 1999 International Olympiad in Informatics and a gold in 2000.

== Career ==
Esfahbod was among the founders of Sharif FarsiWeb Inc., which carried out internationalization and standardization projects related to open source and the Persian language. He was a member of the board of directors of the GNOME Foundation from 2007 to 2010, serving as president from 2008 to 2009.

Esfahbod is an expert in font engineering and internationalization. He has contributed to many open-source projects, including the Cairo, fontconfig, HarfBuzz, and Pango libraries, which are standard components of the GNOME desktop environment, the Google Chrome web browser, and the LibreOffice suite. He received an O'Reilly Open Source Award in 2013 for his work on HarfBuzz.

== Detention in Iran ==
Esfahbod was arrested by the Islamic Revolutionary Guards Corps intelligence unit during a 2020 visit to Tehran. He was then held at Evin Prison, where he was interrogated in solitary confinement for seven days. Iranian security forces released him after he agreed to spy on associates upon returning to the United States.

== Personal life ==
He has a brother and a sister. He is pansexual.
