= WASTE text engine =

Multilingual text-handling library for the Mac OS

The WASTE (an acronym for WorldScript-aware styled text engine) is an Apple Macintosh text editing software library. WASTE helps Macintosh programmers include advanced text display and editing in their applications.

WASTE is a memory-based editor, which places no arbitrary limit on the amount of text being edited, up to available system memory. It supports the Macintosh WorldScript system, allowing it to handle double-byte character sets and bidirectional text. It includes automatic support for undo operations, drag and drop editing, text justification, embedding images into text, and low-level hooks for rendering and measuring text.

WASTE version 2.0 gained support for paragraph-level formatting, additional character styles, multiple undo and redo operations, Unicode translation, and Mac OS X Carbon support, as well as providing new application programming interfaces (APIs) for printing and string matching.

WASTE is a popular third party library used in many Macintosh applications, formerly under the Classic Mac OS and more recently under Mac OS X, including Netscape Navigator, Internet Explorer, Microsoft Entourage, Microsoft Outlook for Mac, REALbasic, and Tex-Edit Plus.

Since WASTE uses deprecated QuickDraw features, it was deprecated in Mac OS X version 10.4 and unsupported as of version 10.6.
