= Sketch-based modeling =

Sketch-based modeling is a method of creating 3D models for use in 3D computer graphics applications. Sketch-based modeling is differentiated from other types of 3D modeling by its interface - instead of creating a 3D model by directly editing polygons, the user draws a 2D shape which is converted to 3D automatically by the application.

== Purpose ==
Many computer users think that traditional 3D modeling programs such as Blender or Maya have a high learning curve. Novice users often have difficulty creating models in traditional modeling programs without first completing a lengthy series of tutorials. Sketch-based modeling tools aim to solve this problem by creating a User interface which is similar to drawing, which most users are familiar with.

=== Uses ===
Sketch-based modeling is primarily designed for use by persons with artistic ability, but no experience with 3D modeling programs. However, sketch-based modeling is also used for other applications. One popular application is rapid modeling of low-detail objects for use in prototyping and design work.

== Operation ==
There are two main types of sketch-based modeling. In the first, the user draws a shape in the workspace using a mouse or a tablet. The system then interprets this shape as a 3D object. Users can then alter the object by cutting off or adding sections. The process of adding sections to a model is generally referred to as overdrawing. The user is never required to interact directly with the vertices or Nurbs control points.

In the second type of sketch-based modeling, the user draws one or more images on paper, then scans in the images. The system then automatically converts the sketches to a 3D model.

== Research ==
A great deal of research is currently being done on sketch-based modeling. A number of papers on this topic are presented each year at the ACM SIGGRAPH conference. The European graphics Association Eurographics sponsored four special conferences on sketch-based modeling:

- Grenoble 2004
- Dublin 2005
- Vienna 2006
- Riverside 2007

Since 2007, Eurographics and ACM SIGGRAPH have co-sponsored the Sketch-Based Interfaces and Modeling Symposium which in 2011 became a part of the Expressive Graphics Symposium

The Eurographics/SIGGRAPH Joint Symposium on Sketch-Based Interfaces and Modeling was held on

- Annecy 2008
- New Orleans 2009
- Jointly with NPAR at Annecy 2010
- at Vancouver together with NPAR and Computational Aesthetics 2011

== See also ==
- Digital sculpting
- Sketch recognition
- Sketch-Based Interfaces and Modeling
- Sketch-Based Modeling: A Survey
