= Apple Type Services for Unicode Imaging =

Unicode text renderer developed by Apple Inc.

- Developer(s): Apple Computer
- Operating system: Classic Mac OS, macOS
- Type: System Utility
- License: Proprietary
- Website: developer.apple.com/ internationalization

The Apple Type Services for Unicode Imaging (ATSUI) is the set of services for rendering Unicode-encoded text introduced in Mac OS 8.5 and carried forward into Mac OS X.

It replaced the WorldScript engine for legacy encodings.

== Obsolescence ==
ATSUI was replaced by a faster and modern Unicode imaging engine called Core Text in Mac OS X 10.5 (Leopard).

It was officially deprecated with Xcode 4.6, which was released in December 2012: "Source code using ATS APIs will generate warnings while being compiled. For 10.8, there will be no loss of functionality but there could be areas where performance will suffer. Programmers are instructed to replace all their ATS code (including ATSUI) with CoreText as ATS functionality will be completely removed in future releases of OS X."

ATSUI was removed in September 2022 for source code targeting only macOS 13 Ventura, and is completely removed in macOS 14 Sonoma.
