= Uniscribe =

Text rendering library

Uniscribe is the Microsoft Windows set of services for rendering Unicode-encoded text, supporting complex text layout. It is implemented in the dynamic link library USP10.DLL. Uniscribe was released with Windows 98 SE, Windows 2000 and Internet Explorer 5.0. In addition, the Windows CE platform has supported Uniscribe since version 5.0.

"USP" is an initialism for Unicode Scripts Processor. Its features include:

- arranging input text from the input sequence to visual sequence;
- substituting glyphs according to context (e.g., different forms of Arabic characters);
- ordering displayed text based on text flow direction, such as left-to-right or right-to left, horizontal or vertical.

Although Uniscribe continues to be maintained as of 2021, its intended replacement DirectWrite, which has more features, was introduced with Windows 7.

== USP10.DLL Versions ==
Below are listed some common versions of usp10.dll, as well as the methods by which they are distributed.

Features are added according only the "major.minor" part of the version number, the third part in the full version number is used for system target identification numbers for which the DLL was ported by Microsoft, and the last part is the build number on each target system version (which may change within regular system/software updates). Some hotfixes provide upgrades only for specific applications (notably in the Office installation directory), and are not suitable for use in the Windows system directory (whose version of the DLL should never be updated and is often protected by the system):

File sizes may vary depending on specific localizations of the DLL (depending on the target system or application for which it was compiled); those given here are for the US-English localization.

Versions of USP10.DLL for the US-English localized platforms
Version number	File Size (bytes)	File Date	Software Bundled by	New feature of this version
10.0.14393.0	79,360 (x64)	2016-08-02	Windows 10 Anniversary Update	?
1.626.7601.23259	627,712 (x86)	2015-11-03	?	?
1.626.7601.19054	627,712 (x86)	2015-11-03	?	?
10.0.10240.16834	626,688 (x64)	2015-07-10	Windows 10	Universal Shaping Engine support for Unicode 7.0 complex scripts
1.626.7601.18454 (Windows 7 GDR)	626,688 (x86); 801,280 (x64)	2014-04-25	KB2957509 – Windows 7, Windows Server 2008 R2, Windows Vista, Windows Server 2008, Windows Server 2003	Security update
1.626.7601.22666 (Windows 7 LDR)	626,688 (x86); 801,792 (x64)	2014-04-25	KB2957509 – Windows 7, Windows Server 2008 R2, Windows Vista, Windows Server 2008, Windows Server 2003	Security update
6.3.9431.0	76,288	2013-06-16	Windows 8.1 (preview)	?
6.2.9200.16384	75,776	2012-07-26	Windows 8	?
1.626.7601.22171	626,688 (x86)	2012-11-22	?	?
1.626.7601.18009	626,688	2012-11-22	KB2786400	An update is available that changes the default settings of the shaping behavior for Arabic text rendering in Windows 7 and Windows Server 2008 R2.
1.626.7601.17514	799,744	2010-11-20	Windows 7 SP1 x64 (RTM)	?
1.626.7601.17514	625,664	2010-11-20	Windows 7 SP1 x86 (RTM)	?
1.626.7601.17105	625,664	2010-09-30	Windows 7 SP1 (RC)	Restore support for unassigned code points
1.626.7600.20796	640,000	2010-09-21	PowerPoint Viewer 2010 (SP1) KB2460050	?
1.626.7600.20602	637,952	2010-01-07	Microsoft Office 2010 (RTM)	Support PR-37: Clarification of the Use of Zero Width Joiner in Indic Scripts; This version supports OpenType on Windows XP.
1.626.7600.16385	643,072	2009-08-04	Microsoft Office 2010 (Beta)	?
1.626.7600.16385	626,688	2009-07-14	Windows 7 (RTM)	?
1.626.7100.0	626,688	2009-04-22	Windows 7 RC	?
1.626.6002.22402	502,784	2010-07-11	Microsoft Office 2007 (SP2) Security Update KB2288621	MS10-063: Description of the security update for the 2007 Office suites: September 14, 2010
1.626.6002.18244	621,568	2010-04-16	Windows Server 2008 SP2, Windows Vista SP2 Security Update KB981322	MS10-063: Description of the security update for Windows Unicode Scripts Processor: September 14, 2010
1.626.6002.18005	621,568	2009-04-11	Windows Server 2008 SP2, Windows Vista SP2	?
1.626.6001.18000	501,760	2008-01-19	Windows Server 2008 (RTM), Windows Vista SP1, VOLTSupplementalFiles (July 2008), MS VOLT 1.3 (released July 31, 2008), SIL FieldWorks, Keyman Desktop 7.1	Supports newer OpenType table features; improved support for ligatures and contextual shapes in Indic scripts with simpler fonts
1.626.6001.16510	502,784	2007-04-18	Windows Server "Longhorn" (Beta 3)	?
1.626.6000.20581	502,784	2007-04-19 02:15:55 UTC	Windows Vista Hotfix KB936176	FIX: incorrect rendering of fully decomposed characters in NFD form encoded in sequences with more than 2 characters (affects 114 Latin characters decomposed in sequences of 3 codes)
1.626.6000.16386	502,784	2006-11-02 09:44:03 UTC	Windows Vista Ultimate (RTM)	DirectX 10? WDDM?
1.626.5756.0	502,784	2006-10-13	Microsoft Office 2007 Ultimate (RTM)	Supports Oriya and Kannada scripts
1.615.5384.4	495,616	2006-06-17	Windows Vista (Beta 2)	DirectX 9?
1.614.5315.0	464,896	2006-03-13	Microsoft Office 2007 (Beta 2)	OpenType typographic features?
1.613.5291.0	492,544	2006-01-04	Windows Vista (Beta 1)	Microsoft VOLT 1.2
1.609.5219.0	480,256	2005-08-17	Microsoft Office 12 Professional (Beta 1)	OpenType typographic features?
1.606.5065.1	?	?	Third-party software	Supports Mongolian script
1.606.5078.0	?	?	Hotfix for SIL fonts	FIX : Combining mark sequences in Latin script may be incorrectly rendered
1.601.5022.8	438,272	2005-01-07	Microsoft Sinhala Enabling Pack for XP 0.42	Supports Sinhala script
1.473.4067.15	424,960	2004-10-22	Third-party software	Microsoft Visual OpenType Layout Tool (VOLT) 1.1.225 update
1.473.4067.0	424,960	2004-10-22	Third-party software	Supports Malayalam script; VOLTSupplementalFiles (Nov 2004); rendering improvement up to 3 diacritics with CGJ
1.471.4063.0	424,960	2004-02-04	Microsoft Office 2003 (fix), SIL FieldWorks (Speech Tools Phonology Assistant 3.0.1)	?
1.471.4030.0	413,184	2004-04-15	Microsoft Office 2003, Google Earth	?
1.468.4015.0	?	?	Paratext 6	Supports Tibetan script.
1.468.4011.0	?	?	?	Supports Tibetan script.
1.460.3707.0	?	?	MS VOLT 1.1.206	Supports Khmer script
1.453.3665.0	?	?	VOLTSupplementalFiles (Aug 2002)	?
1.422.3790.1830	364,032	2005-03-30	Windows Server 2003 (SP1)	FIX?
1.421.3790.0	353,280	2003-03-25	Windows Server 2003	Support for DirectX, GDI+ and newer display driver model
1.420.2600.5969	406,016	2010-04-16	Windows XP (SP3) Security Update KB981322	MS10-063: Description of the security update for Windows Unicode Scripts Processor: September 14, 2010
1.420.2600.5512	406,016	2008-04-14	Windows XP Build 5512 (SP3)	FIX?
1.420.2600.3163	406,016	2007-06-26	Windows XP (SP2) Hotfix KB939450	FIX: The GetCharacterPlacement function unexpectedly returns zero
1.420.2600.2791	406,016	2005-11-05	Windows XP (SP2) Hotfix KB910466	FIX: You may receive a "MEM_BAD_POINTER" error message on a computer that is running Windows XP with Service Pack 2
1.420.2600.2180	406,528	2004-08-12	Windows XP Build 2180 (SP2)	Supports Bengali and Malayalam scripts; supports complex Latin (for Vietnamese); FIX: ligation of tone contours
1.409.2600.1106	339,456	2002-08-29	Windows XP Build 1106 (SP1)	?
1.408.2600.1020	339,456	2002-04-17	Internet Explorer 6.0.2800.1106 (SP1)	?
1.407.2600.0	339,456	2001-08-17	Windows XP	Supports Thaana, Gujarati, Kannada, Gurmukhi (Punjabi), Syriac and Telugu scripts
1.405.2416.1	325,120	2001-01-15	Microsoft Office XP (2002), Microsoft Word 2000 (SP1)	Fully supports Hebrew, Devanagari and Tamil scripts
1.400.2411.1	323,072	2000-12-13	Internet Explorer 6	?
1.325.2195.6692	315,664	2003-06-19	Windows 2000 SP4 (?)	?
1.325.2195.?	?	2001-09-25	Microsoft Windows Installer 2.0 Redistributable for Windows 95/98/Me KB827763	Needed for Microsoft viewers (which otherwise require 98SE at least) of Powerpoint 2003 (and later) presentations on Windows 95 and 98
1.325.2195.1340	315,664	2000-07-21	Windows 2000 SP1	Fully supports Arabic script
1.325.2180.1	323,584	2000-06-08	Windows Me	Improved API for scripts with bidirectional and complex layouts; minimum support for Arabic and Hebrew scripts (no contextual letter forms, requires compatibility character mappings in fonts)
1.325.2180.1	315,152	2000-04-26	Microsoft Global IME for Microsoft Office XP	Improved API for scripts with bidirectional and complex layouts; minimum support for Arabic and Hebrew scripts (no contextual letter forms, requires compatibility character mappings in fonts)
1.325.2180.1	315,152	1999-11-30	Internet Explorer 5.5 release, SP1 & SP2	Improved API for scripts with bidirectional and complex layouts; minimum support for Arabic and Hebrew scripts (no contextual letter forms, requires compatibility character mappings in fonts)
1.175.0.1	274,432	1999-04-05	Windows 98 SE	First stable Uniscribe API; supports simple alphabetic scripts with decomposed diacritics (Latin, Greek, Cyrillic)
1.175.0.1	264,976	1999-01-28	Internet Explorer 5.01	First stable Uniscribe API; supports simple alphabetic scripts with decomposed diacritics (Latin, Greek, Cyrillic)
1.163.1890.1	268,288	1998-09-22	Third-party software	Multilanguage Text Layout and Complex Scripts (MTLCS) snapshot (early release for developers)

== Universal Shaping Engine ==
Scripts with complex text layout have contextual and non-linear requirements to render their typography correctly. These requirements include: ligatures, where two consecutive characters are combined into one shape (Latin, Devanagari); reordering, where some characters are written before the letter they follow in pronunciation (Bengali, Sinhala, and other Indic scripts); and context-shaping, where some letters have to change shape depending on whether they occur in the beginning, middle, or the end of the word (Arabic, Mongolian).

Uniscribe uses several script-specific shaping engines for handling typography in supported complex scripts; these are implemented in addition to a generic engine for non-complex scripts (such as Latin or Cyrillic). The currently used engines include Indic (Bengali, Devanagari, Gujarati, Gurmukhi, Kannada, etc.), Arabic, Hangul, Hebrew, Khmer, Myanmar, and Thai/Lao variants.

The complexity of the Unicode standard and ambiguities in OpenType specification often result in incomplete or erroneous implementations of complex text layout. Script-specific shaping engines work on a case-by-case basis and do not consistently handle common features of OpenType fonts, which makes it difficult for OS programmers and font developers to support new scripts. Implementation errors are very hard or impossible to correct at a later stage without breaking up backward compatibility for existing documents and fonts, often requiring new OpenType layout features and a redesign of existing fonts and typography rendering engines.

In Windows 10, major refactoring work was done for Uniscribe to implement a generalized shaping model, the Universal Shaping Engine (USE). This engine is directly based on glyph properties defined in the Unicode standard, in the hope that any complex script with a suitable font would be supported without the time and effort required to create a dedicated shaping engine.

USE builds on a generalized "universal cluster model" developed for the Indic scripts, which models a superset of human writing systems. The engine classifies each character of a complex script into several categories, base classes and subclasses. For example, a provisional Indic classification includes general, syllabic and positional categories, further divided into base (number, consonant, tone letter, dependent vowel, etc.), base vowel (independent vowel), number (Brahmi joining number), final, medial, and modifier consonants, medial consonants, as well as top, bottom, left and right consonants and vowels. Unicode symbol strings are converted into collections of USE classes using well-defined rules, making glyph composition a standard procedure and allowing inter-character interactions not possible with current language features defined in OpenType specifications.

The Universal Shaping Engine was presented at the OpenType Developer Meeting in 2014; a compatible approach was also implemented by the open source HarfBuzz text shaper. As of 2020, the USE in Windows 10 handles a total of 70 complex scripts: Adlam, Ahom, Balinese, Batak, Bhaiksuki, Brahmi, Buginese, Buhid, Chakma, Cham, Chorasmian, Dives Akuru, Duployan, Egyptian Hieroglyphs, Elymaic, Grantha, Gunjala Gondi, Hanifi Rohingya, Hanunoo, Javanese, Kaithi, Kayah Li, Kharoshthi, Khitan Small Script, Khojki, Khudawadi, Lepcha, Limbu, Mahajani, Makasar, Mandaic, Manichaean, Marchen, Masaram Gondi, Medefaidrin, Meitei Mayek, Miao, Modi, Mongolian, Multani, Nandinagari, Newa, N’Ko, Nyiakeng Puachue Hmong, Pahawh Hmong, Phags-pa, Psalter Pahlavi, Rejang, Saurashtra, Sharada, Siddham, Sinhala, Sogdian, Old Sogdian, Soyombo, Sundanese, Syloti Nagri, Tagalog, Tagbanwa, Tai Le, Tai Tham (limited support), Tai Viet, Takri, Tibetan, Tifinagh, Tirhuta, Wancho, Yezidi, and Zanabazar Square.

== Versions ==
Although Uniscribe has been available since Windows 2000, new versions of Uniscribe have provided more functions to the system, namely, support for other writing systems. An earlier update of it supports the display of Arabic and Hebrew, then Thai and Vietnamese. Since Windows XP, more South Asian and Assyrian scripts are supported.

== See also ==
- International Components for Unicode
- OpenType
- Apple Advanced Typography
- Pango
- Graphite (SIL)
- DirectWrite
