= Apple Advanced Typography =

Computer technology by Apple

- Filename extension: .ttf, .ttc
- Type code: 0100, "ttcf"
- Developed by: Apple
- Type of format: Font file
- Extended from: TrueType, PostScript fonts
- Website: https://developer.apple.com/fonts/TrueType-Reference-Manual/RM06/Chap6AATIntro.html

Apple Advanced Typography (AAT) is Apple Inc.'s computer technology for advanced font rendering, supporting internationalization and complex features for typographers, a successor to Apple's little-used QuickDraw GX font technology of the mid-1990s.

It is a set of extensions to the TrueType outline font standard, with smartfont features similar to the OpenType font format that was developed by Adobe and Microsoft, and to Graphite. It incorporates concepts from Adobe's "multiple master" font format, allowing for axes of traits to be defined and morphing of a glyph independently along each of these axes. AAT font features do not alter the underlying typed text; they only affect the characters' representation during glyph conversion.

== Features ==
Example of the extra glyphs and ligatures available in the Zapfino typeface

Significant features of AAT include:

- Several degrees of ligature control
- Kashida justification and joiners
- Cross-stream kerning (required for Nasta'liq Urdu, for example)
- Indic vowel rearrangement
- Independently controllable substitution of:
  - Old style figures
  - Small caps and drop caps
  - Swash variants
  - Alternative glyphs:
    - Individual alternatives on a per-glyph basis
    - Wholesale alternatives, such as engraved text
  - Anything else the font designer wants to add
- Glyph variation axes

AAT font features are supported on Mac OS 8.5 and above and all versions of macOS. The cross-platform ICU library provided basic AAT support for left-to-right scripts. HarfBuzz version 2 has added AAT shaping support, an open-source implementation of the technology which Chrome/Chromium as version 72 and LibreOffice as version 6.3 uses instead of CoreText for rendering macOS AAT fonts in cross-platform way.

As of OS X Yosemite and iOS 8, AAT supports language-specific shaping: that is, changing how glyphs are processed depending on the human language they are being used to represent. This support is available through the use of language tags in Core Text. Provision was added at the same time for the relative positioning of two glyphs via anchor points via the 'kerx' and 'ankr' tables.

== AAT and OpenType in macOS ==
As of Mac OS X 10.3 Panther, partial support for OpenType is available. As of 2011, support is limited to Western and Arabic scripts. If a font has AAT tables, they will be used for typography. If the font does not have AAT tables but does have OpenType tables, they will be used to the extent that the system supports them.

This means that many OpenType fonts for Western or Middle Eastern scripts can be used without modification on Mac OS X 10.5, but South Asian scripts such as Thai and Devanagari cannot. These require AAT tables for proper layout.

== AAT Layout ==
AAT requires the text to be turned entirely into glyphs before text layout occurs. Operations on the text take place entirely within the glyph layer.

The core table used in the AAT layout process is the "morx" table. This table is divided into a series of chains, each further divided into subtables. The chains and subtables are processed in order. When each subtable is encountered, the layout engine compares flags in the subtable against control flags, generally derived from user settings. This determines whether or not the subtable is processed.

The set of available features in the font is made accessible to the user via the "feat" table. This table provides pointers to the localizable strings that can be used to describe a feature to the end user and the appropriate flags to send to the text engine if the feature is selected. Features can be made invisible to the user by the simple expedient of not including entries in the "feat" table for them. Apple uses this approach, for example, to support required ligatures.

Subtables may perform non-contextual glyph substitutions, contextual glyph substitutions, glyph rearrangements, glyph insertions, and ligature formation. Contextual actions are sensitive to the surrounding text. They can be used, for example, to automatically turn an s into a medial s anywhere in a word except at its end.

The "morx" subtables for non-contextual glyph substitutions are simple mapping tables between the glyph substituted and its substitute. The others all involve the use of finite-state machines.

For the purposes of processing the finite-state machine, glyphs are organized into classes. A class may be small, containing only a single glyph (for something like ligature formation), or it may include dozens glyphs or even more. A special class is automatically defined for any glyph not included in any of the explicit classes. Special classes are also available for the end of the glyph stream and glyphs deleted from the glyph stream.

Beginning with a start-of-text state, the layout engine parses the text, glyph by glyph. Depending on its current state and the class of the glyph it encounters, it will switch to a new state and possibly perform an appropriate action. The process continues until the glyph stream is exhausted.

The use of finite-state machines allows "morx" tables to be relatively small and to be processed relatively quickly. They also provide considerable flexibility. Inasmuch, however, as Apple's font tools require the generation of "morx" tables via raw state table information, they can be difficult to produce and debug. The font designer is also responsible for making sure that "morx" subtables are ordered correctly for the desired effect.

AAT operates entirely with glyphs and never with characters, so all the layout information necessary for producing the proper display resides within the font itself. This allows fonts to be added for new scripts without requiring any specific support from the OS. Third parties can produce fonts for scripts not officially supported by Apple, and they will work with macOS. On the other hand, this also means that every font for a given script requires its own copy of the script's shaping information in its own "morx" tables.

Other AAT tables (or AAT-specific extensions to standard TrueType tables) allow for context-sensitive kerning, justification, and ligature splitting. AAT also supports variation fonts, in which a font's shape can vary depending on a scaled value supplied by the user. Variation fonts are similar to Adobe's defunct Multiple master fonts, where the endpoints are defined and any medial value is valid. With this, the user can then drag sliders in the user interface to make glyphs taller or shorter, to make them fatter or thinner, to increase or decrease the size of the serifs, and the like, all independently of one another. Glyphs may even have their fundamental shapes radically altered. Before OpenType introduced Font Variation in September 2016, there is nothing like this in OpenType.

Other AAT tables can also have point-size dependent effects; for example, at 12 points, the horizontal and vertical strokes can be of similar width, but at 300 points, the stroke width variation could be quite great.

In practice, few AAT fonts use any features of the technology other than those available through the "morx" table. Zapfino, Hoefler Text, and Skia are fonts that ship with macOS that illustrate a variety of AAT's capabilities.

== AAT for Indic scripts ==
For Indic scripts, the only features that are necessary are glyph reordering and substitution; AAT supports both of these. As noted above, OpenType fonts for Indic scripts require AAT tables to be added before they will function properly on macOS. However, this applies only to software dependent on the system support of OpenType. Programs that provide their own implementation of OpenType will render Indic properly with OpenType fonts. (They may, however, not render Indic fonts with AAT tables correctly.)

Mac OS X 10.5 shipped with fonts for Devanagari, Gurmukhi, Gujarati, Thai, Tibetan, and Tamil. Fonts for other Indic scripts were included in later versions of macOS and iOS, as well as being available from third parties.

== See also ==
- Apple typography
- Graphite (SIL) technology on MS Windows and Linux
- List of typographic features
- XeTeX
