= WorldScript =

Text rendering engine for Apple Macintosh

WorldScript is the multilingual text rendering engine for Apple Macintosh's classic Mac OS, before Mac OS X was introduced.

Starting with version 7.1, Apple unified the implementation of non-Roman script systems in a programming interface called WorldScript. WorldScript I was used for all one-byte character sets and WorldScript II for two-byte sets. Support for new script systems was added by so-called Language Kits. Some kits were provided with foreign versions of the system software, and others were sold by Apple and third parties. Application support for WorldScript was not universal, since building in support was a significant task.

In 8.5, full Unicode support was added to Mac OS through an API called Apple Type Services for Unicode Imaging (ATSUI). However, WorldScript remained the dominant technology for international text until Mac OS X, because of limited application support for ATSUI.

== Legacy ==
Good international support gave a marketing edge to word-processing programs such as Nisus Writer and programs using the WASTE text engine, because Microsoft Word prior to version 2001 was not WorldScript aware.

Mark Davis had co-founded the Unicode Consortium, co-authored his first major internationalization framework in the form of WorldScript at Apple, became the internationalization architect at Taligent where he designed what became all the internationalization support for the Java Development Kit 1.1, became IBM's Chief Software Globalization Architect, moved to Google to work on internationalization and Unicode, and now helps to choose the emojis for the world's smartphones.
