= ANGLE (software) =

Open source graphics engine abstraction layer developed by Google

- Developer: Google
- Written in: C++
- Platform: Cross-platform
- Type: Graphics engine
- License: BSD 3-Clause License
- Website: angleproject.org
- Repository: chromium.googlesource.com/angle/angle

ANGLE (Almost Native Graphics Layer Engine) is an open source, cross-platform graphics engine abstraction layer developed by Google. ANGLE translates OpenGL ES 2/3 calls to Direct3D 9, 11, OpenGL, Vulkan or Metal API calls. It is a portable version of OpenGL but with limitations of OpenGL ES standard.

The API is mainly designed to bring up a high-performance OpenGL compatibility to Microsoft Windows and to web browsers such as Chromium by translating OpenGL calls to Direct3D, which has much better driver support on Windows systems. On Windows, there are two backend renderers for ANGLE: the oldest one uses Direct3D 9.0c, while the newer one uses Direct3D 11.

ANGLE is currently used by Google Chrome (embedded into the Blink browser engine), Firefox, Edge, Safari, and the Qt Framework. The engine is also used by Windows 10 for compatibility with apps ported from Android. Throughout 2019, the Apple team contributed a Metal API backend for ANGLE so Apple devices could run on their native graphics APIs.

ANGLE is distributed under a BSD-license.

== History ==
The project started as a way for Google to bring full hardware acceleration for WebGL to Windows without relying on OpenGL graphics drivers. Google initially released the program under the BSD license.

The current production version (2.1.x) implements OpenGL ES 2.0, 3.0, 3.1 and EGL 1.5, claiming to pass the conformance tests for both. Work was started on then future OpenGL ES 3.0 version, for the newer Direct3D 11 backend.

The capability to use ANGLE in a Windows Store app was added in 2014. Microsoft contributed support for lower feature levels to the project. Supporting CoreWindow and SwapChainPanel in ANGLE's EGL allows applications to run on Windows 8.1, Windows Phone 8.1, and later.

== Level of OpenGL ES support via backing renderers ==
	Direct3D 9	Direct3D 11	Desktop GL	GL ES	Vulkan	Metal
OpenGL ES 2.0	complete	complete	complete	complete	complete	complete
OpenGL ES 3.0		complete	complete	complete	complete	complete
OpenGL ES 3.1		incomplete	complete	complete	complete	
OpenGL ES 3.2			in progress	in progress	complete	

	Direct3D 9	Direct3D 11	Desktop GL	GL ES	Vulkan	Metal
Windows	complete	complete	complete	complete	complete	
Linux			complete		complete	
macOS			complete			complete
iOS						complete
ChromeOS				complete	Planned	
Android				complete	complete	
GGP (Stadia)					complete	
Fuchsia					complete	

== Software utilizing ANGLE ==
ANGLE is currently used in a number of programs and software.

- ANGLE for Windows Store provides Windows developers precompiled ANGLE binaries via a NuGet package.
- Candy Crush Saga uses ANGLE as the default renderer in its Windows Store version of the application.
- Chromium and Google Chrome. Chrome uses ANGLE not only for WebGL, but also for its implementation of the 2D HTML5 canvas and for the graphics layer of the Google Native Client (which is OpenGL ES 2.0 compatible).
- Cocos2d uses ANGLE as its rendering engine for applications published to the Windows Store.
- Firefox uses ANGLE as the default WebGL backend on Windows.
- GameMaker: Studio uses ANGLE at compile-time to convert GLSL ES shaders to HLSL9 for the old Windows 32-bit export module.
- Godot uses ANGLE as an option for compatibility renderer for Windows and MacOS platforms starting with Godot 4.2
- Grand Theft Auto V included ANGLE in the installation, normally at Systemdrive.
- Krita started using ANGLE as the rendering engine on Windows starting on version 3.3.0.
- Ladybird uses ANGLE as the rendering engine on Windows.
- Microsoft Edge has ANGLE as a rendering option in the "Standards Preview" page in Windows Insider build 17025.
- OpenRA uses ANGLE for rendering on Windows
- Qt 5 uses ANGLE as the default renderer for its OpenGL ES 2.0 API wrapper and other Qt elements which use it on Windows.
- RuneScape NXT client uses ANGLE to provide a Direct3D 9 compatibility mode for older graphics cards.
- Safari web browser uses ANGLE as basis for its WebGL implementation.
- Shovel Knight uses ANGLE as rendering engine, as seen in final credits.
- SolveSpace uses ANGLE on Windows.
