= Oak Technology =

American semiconductor company

- Industry: Semiconductors
- Founded: 1987; 39 years ago
- Fate: acquired by Zoran Corporation in 2003
- Headquarters: Sunnyvale, California, United States
- Area served: Worldwide
- Products: GPU and video, CD-ROM, optical storage

Oak Technology (OAKT) was an American supplier of semiconductor chips for sound cards, graphics cards and optical storage devices such as CD-ROM, CD-RW and DVD. It achieved success with optical storage chips and its stock price increased substantially around the time of the tech bubble in 2000. After falling on hard times, in 2003 it was acquired by Zoran Corporation.

Oak Technology helped develop the ATAPI standard and provided the oakcdrom.sys CD-ROM driver that was ubiquitous on DOS-based systems in the mid-1990s.

== History ==
Oak Technology, Inc. was founded by semiconductor pioneer David Tsang in 1987 and was headquartered in Sunnyvale, California, United States with operations across the US and Asia Pacific. During the late 1980s through the early 1990s, Oak was a supplier of PC graphics (SVGA) chipsets, CD-ROM controller chips and PCBs. Oak Technology also supplied motherboard chipsets – a PS/2-compatible chipset and the Oaknote chipset for notebooks. Oak enjoyed modest success in the value segment (low-end) of the market.

In 1994, Sun Microsystems decided to change the name of its new language from Oak to Java because Oak was already trademarked by Oak Technology.

== Initial Public Offering (IPO) ==
The company had a dominant position early on in the market for semiconductors for CD-ROM drives (around 1995) and with business lines including PC graphics and optical storage for the personal computing market led to a successful IPO and Secondary Offering shortly thereafter. Oak regained a prominent position in optical storage chips as the market transitioned to recordable/rewritable technology, resulting in substantial revenue growth and stock price appreciation at the height of the tech bubble in 2000.

However, the company could not maintain growth and the stock price declined substantially, including a drop by more than half on 19 June 2002.

It then acquired the pioneering digital TV chip company Teralogic at the end of 2002 whose technology would later contribute to Zoran's DTV chip development after Zoran acquired Oak Technology in 2003.

== Graphics products ==
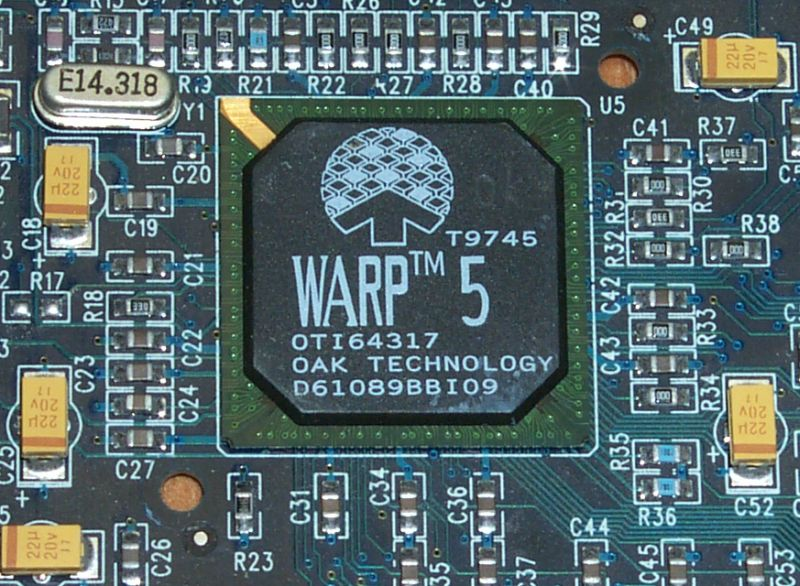
Warp 5 OTI 64317

Oak's graphics efforts started off in 2D but by the mid 1990s, the Company encouraged by ambitions to bring forward advanced level 3D graphics at reasonable cost for PC and gaming embarked on the Warp 5 (below). Oak formed a 3-D graphics business unit, and in 1996, Oak announced that its new graphics controllers would support Microsoft’s “Direct3D” and “ActiveMovie” game and video playback formats.

Warp 5 - OTI 64317 - During the mid 1990s, Oak was developing its first and only 2D/3D graphics accelerator chip. Warp 5 was to be a tile-based deferred renderer (TBDR), similar to PowerVR's chipsets but was the first to combine tiling with other high performance rendering algorithms including anti aliasing and tri linear mip mapping. In the same vein as the S3 ViRGE chip, the Warp 5 was pin-compatible with a 2D-only predecessor.

Technologies contained in the Warp 5 were well ahead of its era. This graphics processor was based on a region concept and had many similarities to Microsoft's Talisman architecture. The chip processed each region at a time and did on chip z-sorting and anti-aliasing. As a result, the chip did 24-bit floating point Z, sub-pixel anti-aliasing, order independent translucency, non-linear fogging and atmospheric effects and MIP-Mapping. Typically, such region based architectures are gated by the number of polygons that can be processed per region, but Oak claimed that there were no such limitations in the WARP 5.

The specifications included:

- 50m pixels/sec (all features turned on)
- EDO and SGRAM Memory Supported - 8 MB
- On-chip Texture Cache
- 2D GUI acceleration
- Video Scaling in Y
- VBI support Including Intercast
- 220 MHz RAMDAC
- Resolutions to 1600 × 1200
- Direct3D and BRender APIs supported
- OS support Windows 95 and Windows NT
- Packaging - 256 pin BGA
- Pin Compatibility with OAK OTI-74217 EON 2D GUI accelerator

== List of Graphics products ==
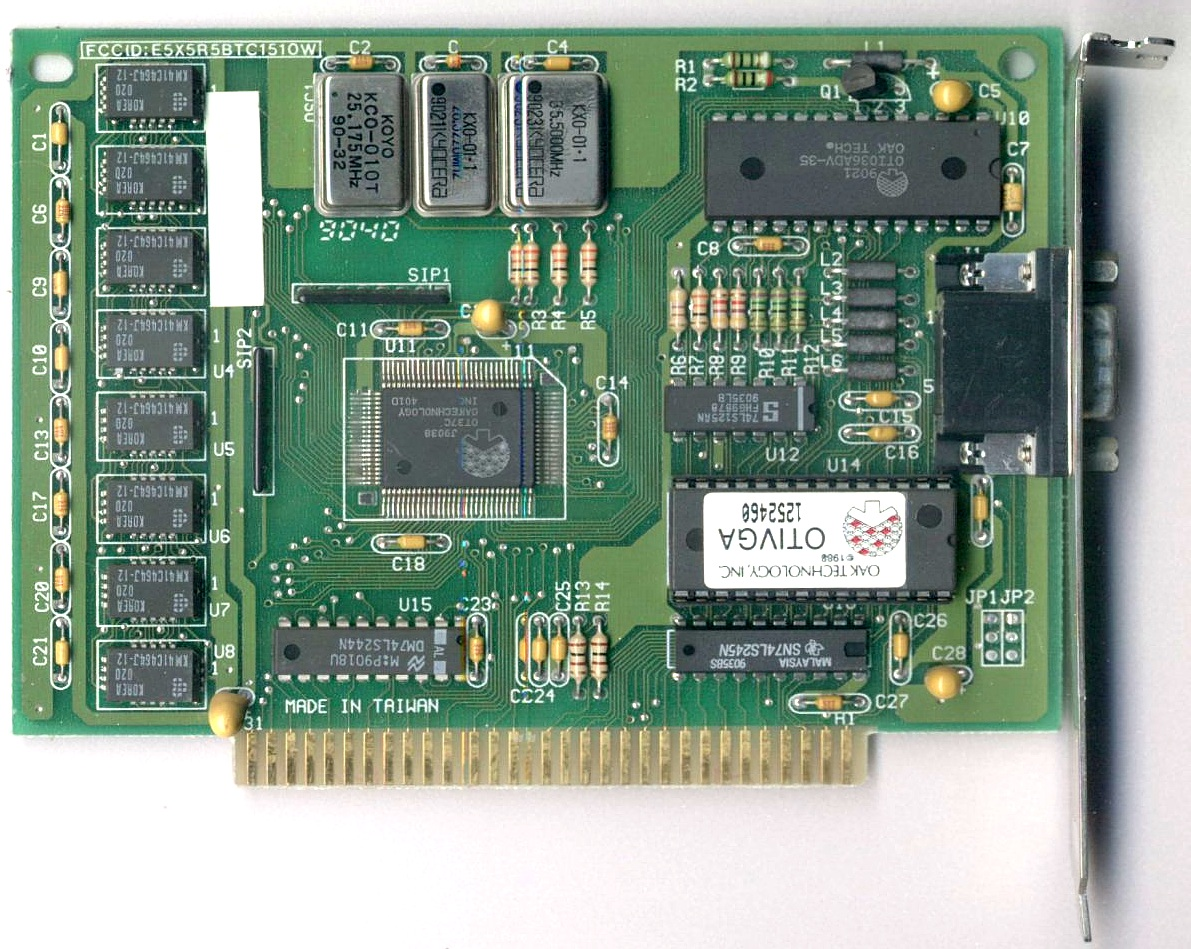
OTI037C

OTI037C - 8-bit VGA chipset, with up to 256KB of DRAM. Provided support for VGA, EGA & CGA display modes. Most are only able to do standard VGA modes. (i.e. up to 320×200×256 and up to 640×480×16).

OTI057/067 - ISA SVGA chipset. Supports up to 512KB of DRAM (usually 70/80 ns).

OTI077 - Enhanced version of the OTI067. Includes support for 1MB and up to 65 MHz dot clock. Capable of resolutions up to 1024×768×256 colors in non-interlaced mode, and up to 1280×1024×16 colors interlaced.

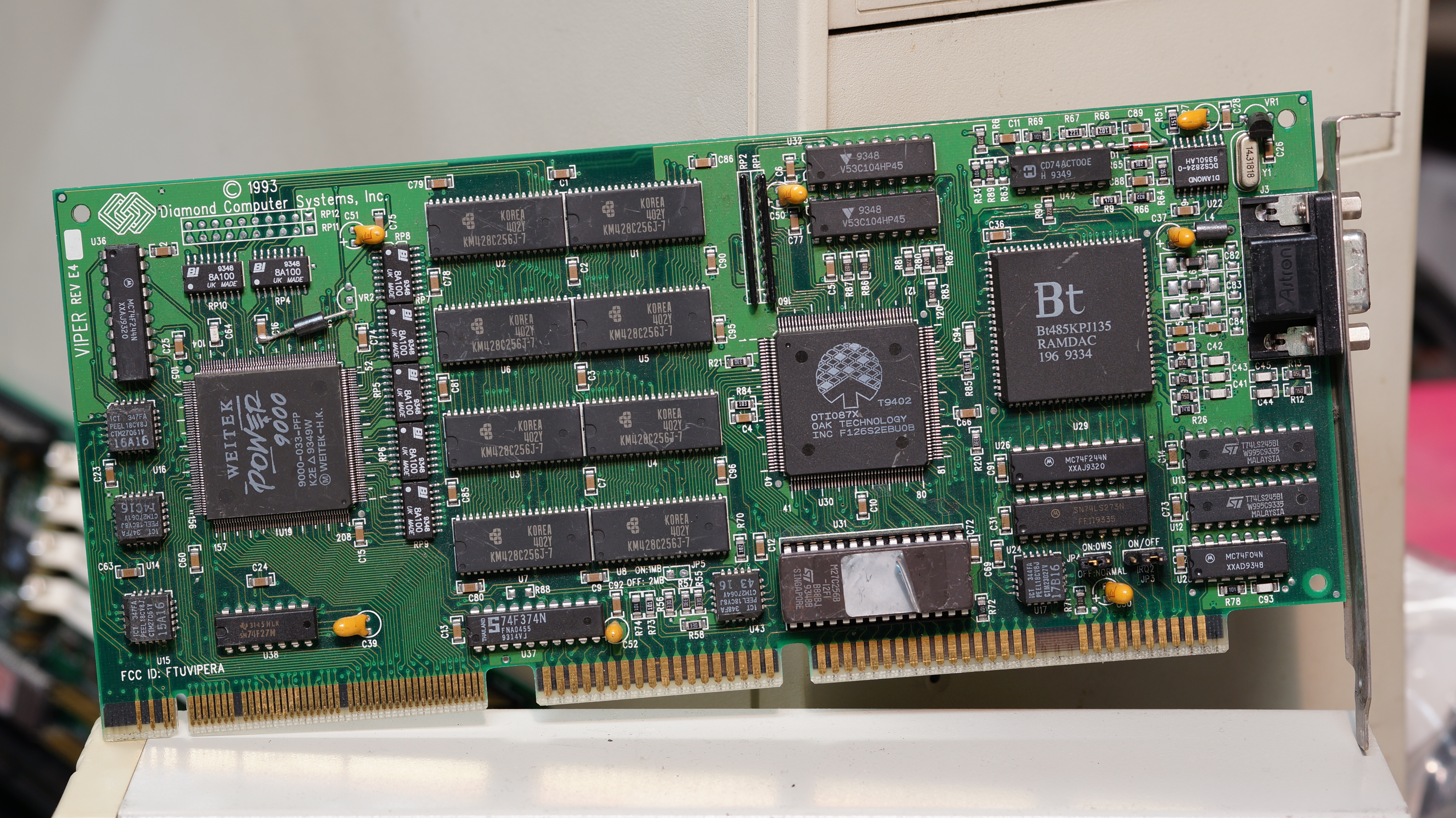
Diamond Viper VLB video card with OTI087 and Weitek Power 9000

OTI087 - ISA SVGA chipset, and one of the first VLB chipsets available. Has a 16-bit external data path, and a 32-bit internal memory controller data path. It features an improved, local-bus compatible host interface controller with read and write caching capabilities similar to those implemented on Tseng ET4000AX graphics chips, along with register-based color expansion, color fill, 16-bit graphic latch and some other new (for its time) features. Maximum BIOS resolutions are 1024x768x256 non-interlaced and 1280×1024×256 interlaced. Maximum dot clock is 80 MHz, but is usually coupled with the OTI068 clock generator capable of frequencies up to 78 MHz. This chipset supports up to 2MB of 70/70R ns DRAM.

A modified version, OTI087X, added a hardware mouse cursor sprite. It was implemented on many Weitek P9000-based graphics boards as a companion VGA controller; unfortunately, on these boards the chip was typically configured with a narrow 8-bit data path to its own dedicated VGA memory, resulting in sub-par VGA mode performance.

Spitfire - OTI 64105/64107 - PCI/VLB/ISA chipset with 64-bit DRAM support. Provides 2D/GUI acceleration features comparable to other 64-bit accelerators of its time.

Spitfire - OTI 64111 - Enhanced version of the 64105/64107, with integrated 135 MHz RAMDAC. DRAM and EDO supported.

Eon - OTI 64217 - PCI chipset with support for EDO DRAM and SGRAM.

Warp 5 - OTI 64317 - PCI chipset and 2D/3D graphics accelerator. Support for EDO DRAM and SGRAM, resolutions up to 1600x1200, and Direct3D accelerated graphics. Pin compatible with OTI 64217.

== Optical storage products ==
Oak's entrance into the CD-ROM controller business was a huge success. By 1994, it had sold millions of chip solutions for CD-ROM, CD-R/RW, DVD-ROM and DVD-ROM/CD-RW combo drives, primarily for the PC market. With the IDE interface established and “plug-and-play” CD-ROM drives on the horizon, Oak anticipated an explosion in CD-ROM sales and added a new semiconductor foundry partner in Korea to help it absorb the expected leap in controller orders. In October 1994, Oak released the OTI-201, a new sound and video compression/decompression controller based on the new multimedia MPEG (Motion Pictures Expert Group) standard. MPEG-based videos were most commonly used for public PC-based information kiosks and corporate training videos. The OTI-201 was the industry’s first MPEG decoder designed specifically for multimedia PCS and enabled peripheral manufacturers to offer high-performance MPEG-format graphics and video on a single add-on expansion board. With CD-ROM controllers expected to eventually become a cheap commodity product, CEO, Tsang viewed the OTI-201 as another way for Oak to expand its customer base and maintain its heady growth. With Oak’s experience producing graphics chips and computer connectivity products, Tsang planned even newer generations of PC video display controllers as well as chips for 3D graphics, recordable CD-ROMs, TV set-top boxes, CD Video players, and PC-based video production and teleconferencing. By January 1995 the company that Investor’s Business Daily had once described as a “behind the scenes supplier of minor computer parts” had evolved itself into the world’s leading producer of CD-ROM controller chips, which now generated the lion’s share of its annual revenues. CD-ROM sales in 1995 were three times what they had been in 1993, spurred by the rapid evolution in CD-ROM drive speeds.
