= Framebuffer =

Portion of random-access memory containing a bitmap that drives a video display

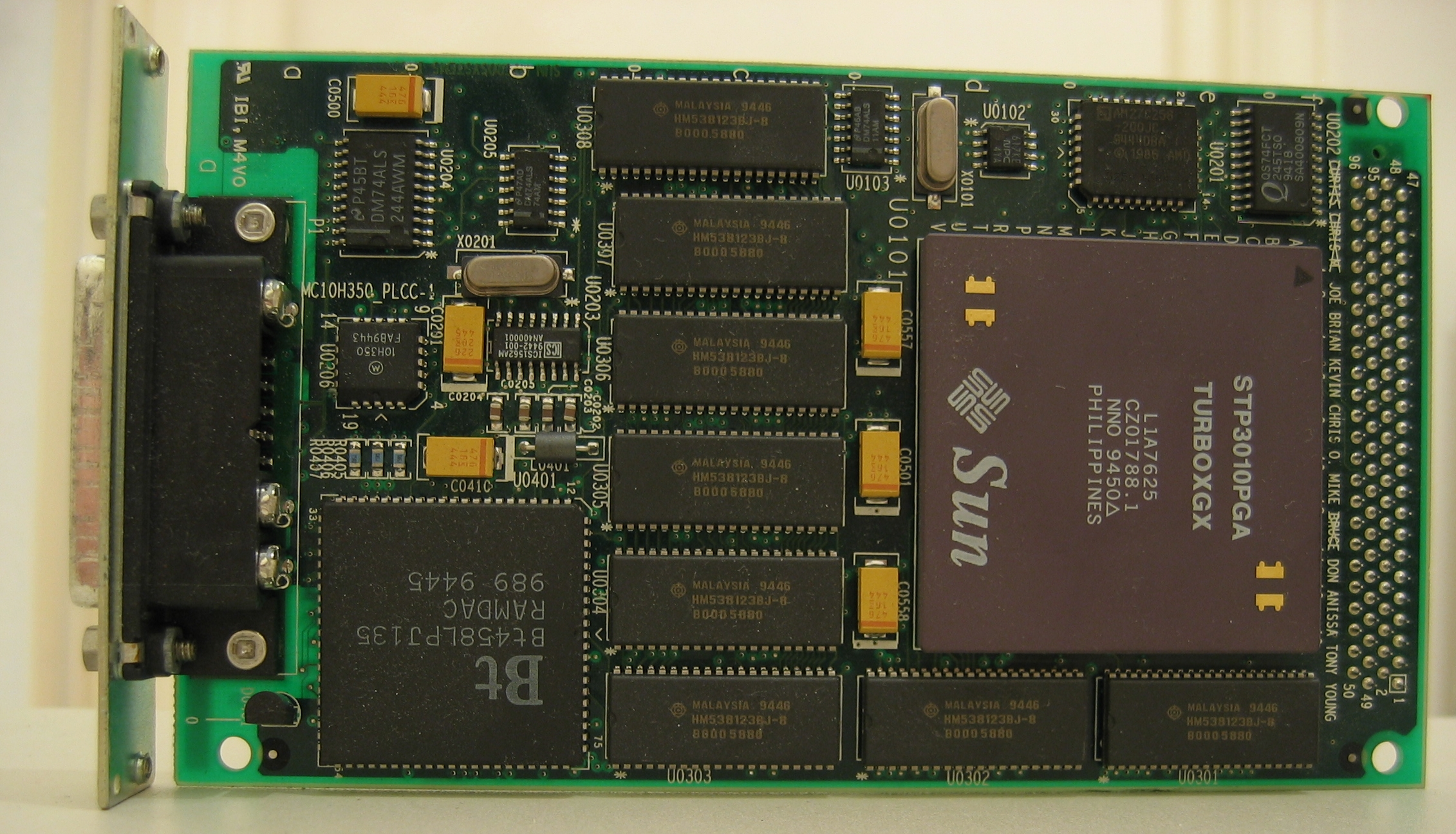
Sun TGX Framebuffer

Sets 1, 2 and 3 represent the operation of single, double and triple frame-buffering, respectively, with vertical synchronization (vsync) enabled. In each graph, time flows from left to right. For details, see the page on multiple buffering.

A framebuffer (frame buffer, or sometimes framestore) is a portion of random-access memory (RAM) containing a bitmap that drives a video display. It is a memory buffer containing data representing all the pixels in a complete video frame. Modern video cards contain framebuffer circuitry in their cores. This circuitry helps convert an in-memory bitmap into a video signal that can be displayed on a computer monitor.

In computing, a screen buffer is a part of computer memory used by a computer application for the representation of the content to be shown on the computer display. The screen buffer may also be called the video buffer, the regeneration buffer, or regen buffer for short. The phrase "screen buffer” refers to a logical function, while video memory refers to a hardware storage location. In particular, the screen buffer may be placed in the main RAM, the video memory, or some other hardware location.

To reduce latency and avoid screen tearing, multiple frames can be buffered, and this technique is called multiple buffering. When this is so, at any time, only one frame would be visible, and the others would not be. The currently invisible frames are located in the off-screen buffer.

The information in the buffer typically consists of color values for every pixel to be shown on the display. Color values are commonly stored in 1-bit binary (monochrome), 4-bit palettized, 8-bit palettized, 16-bit high color and 24-bit true color formats. An additional alpha channel is sometimes used to retain information about pixel transparency. The total amount of memory required for the framebuffer depends on the resolution of the output signal, and on the color depth or palette size.

== History ==
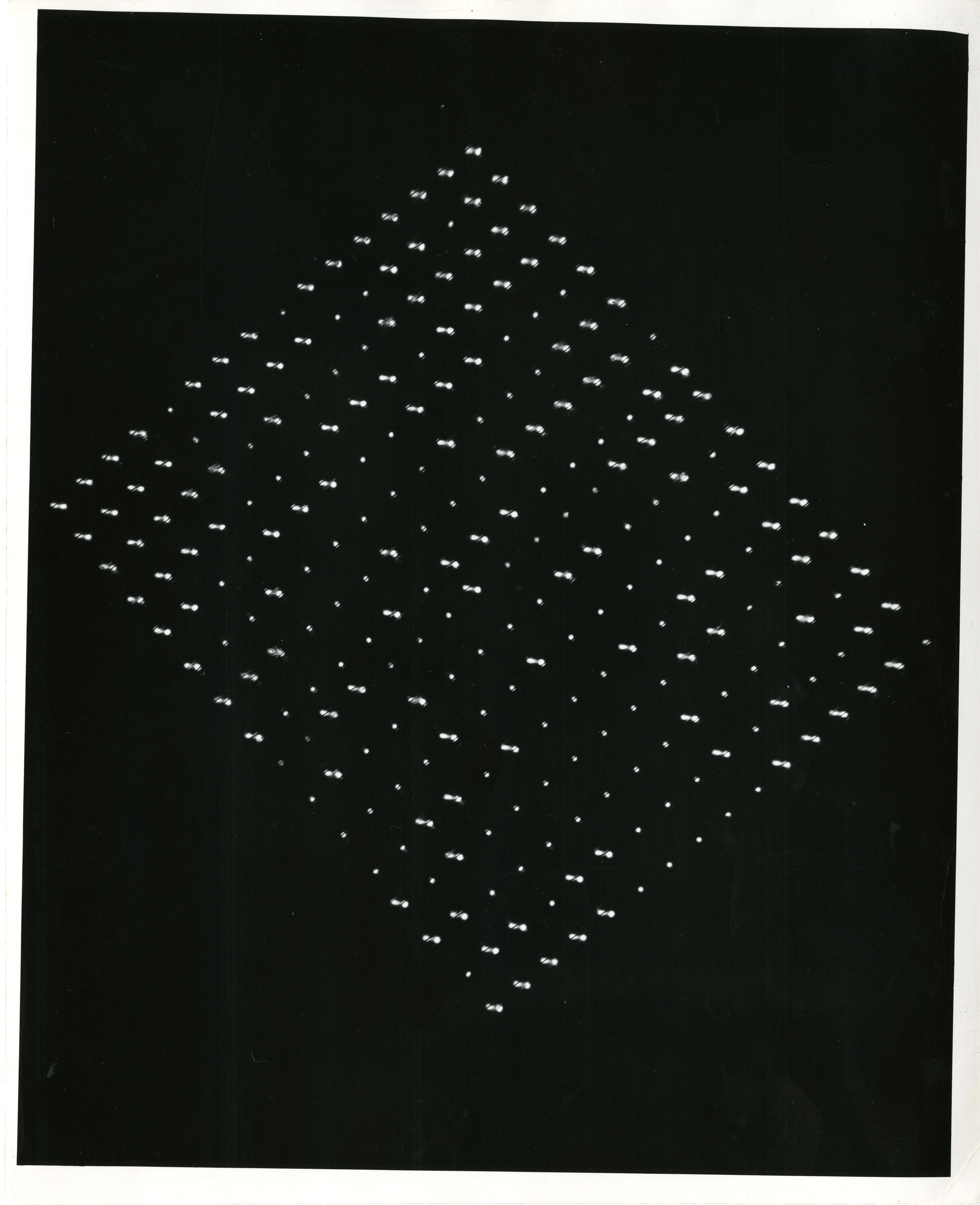
Memory pattern on SWAC Williams tube CRT in 1951

Computer researchers had long discussed the theoretical advantages of a framebuffer but were unable to produce a machine with sufficient memory at an economically practicable cost. In 1947, the Manchester Baby computer used a Williams tube, later the Williams-Kilburn tube, to store 1024 bits on a cathode-ray tube (CRT) memory and displayed on a second CRT. Other research labs were exploring these techniques with MIT Lincoln Laboratory achieving a 4096 display in 1950.

A color-scanned display was implemented in the late 1960s, called the Brookhaven RAster Display (BRAD), which used a drum memory and a television monitor. In 1969, A. Michael Noll of Bell Telephone Laboratories, Inc. implemented a scanned display with a frame buffer, using magnetic-core memory. A year or so later, the Bell Labs system was expanded to display an image with a color depth of three bits on a standard color TV monitor. The vector graphics used in the computer had to be converted for the scanned graphics of a TV display.

In the early 1970s, the development of metal–oxide–semiconductor memory chips, particularly high-density dynamic random-access memory chips with at least 1 kb memory, made it practical to create, for the first time, a digital memory system with framebuffers capable of holding a standard video image. This led to the development of the SuperPaint system by Richard Shoup at Xerox PARC in 1972. Shoup was able to use the SuperPaint framebuffer to create an early digital video-capture system. By synchronizing the output signal to the input signal, Shoup was able to overwrite each pixel of data as it shifted in. Shoup also experimented with modifying the output signal using color tables. These color tables allowed the SuperPaint system to produce a wide variety of colors outside the range of the limited 8-bit data it contained. This scheme would later become commonplace in computer framebuffers.

In 1974, Evans & Sutherland released the first commercial framebuffer, the Picture System, costing about $15,000. It was capable of producing resolutions of up to 512 by 512 pixels in 8-bit grayscale, and became a boon for graphics researchers who did not have the resources to build their own framebuffer. The New York Institute of Technology would later create the first 24-bit color system using three of the Evans & Sutherland framebuffers. Each framebuffer was connected to an RGB color output (one for red, one for green and one for blue), with a Digital Equipment Corporation PDP 11/04 minicomputer controlling the three devices as one.

In 1975, the UK company Quantel produced the first commercial full-color broadcast framebuffer, the Quantel DFS 3000. It was first used in TV coverage of the 1976 Montreal Olympics to generate a picture-in-picture inset of the Olympic flaming torch while the rest of the picture featured the runner entering the stadium.

The rapid improvement of integrated-circuit technology made it possible for many of the home computers of the late 1970s to contain low-color-depth framebuffers. Today, nearly all computers with graphical capabilities utilize a framebuffer for generating the video signal. Amiga computers, created in the 1980s, featured special design attention to graphics performance and included a unique Hold-And-Modify framebuffer capable of displaying 4096 colors.

Framebuffers also became popular in high-end workstations and arcade system boards throughout the 1980s. SGI, Sun Microsystems, HP, DEC and IBM all released framebuffers for their workstation computers in this period. These framebuffers were usually of a much higher quality than could be found in most home computers, and were regularly used in television, printing, computer modeling and 3D graphics. Framebuffers were also used by Sega for its high-end arcade boards, which were also of a higher quality than on home computers.

== Display modes ==
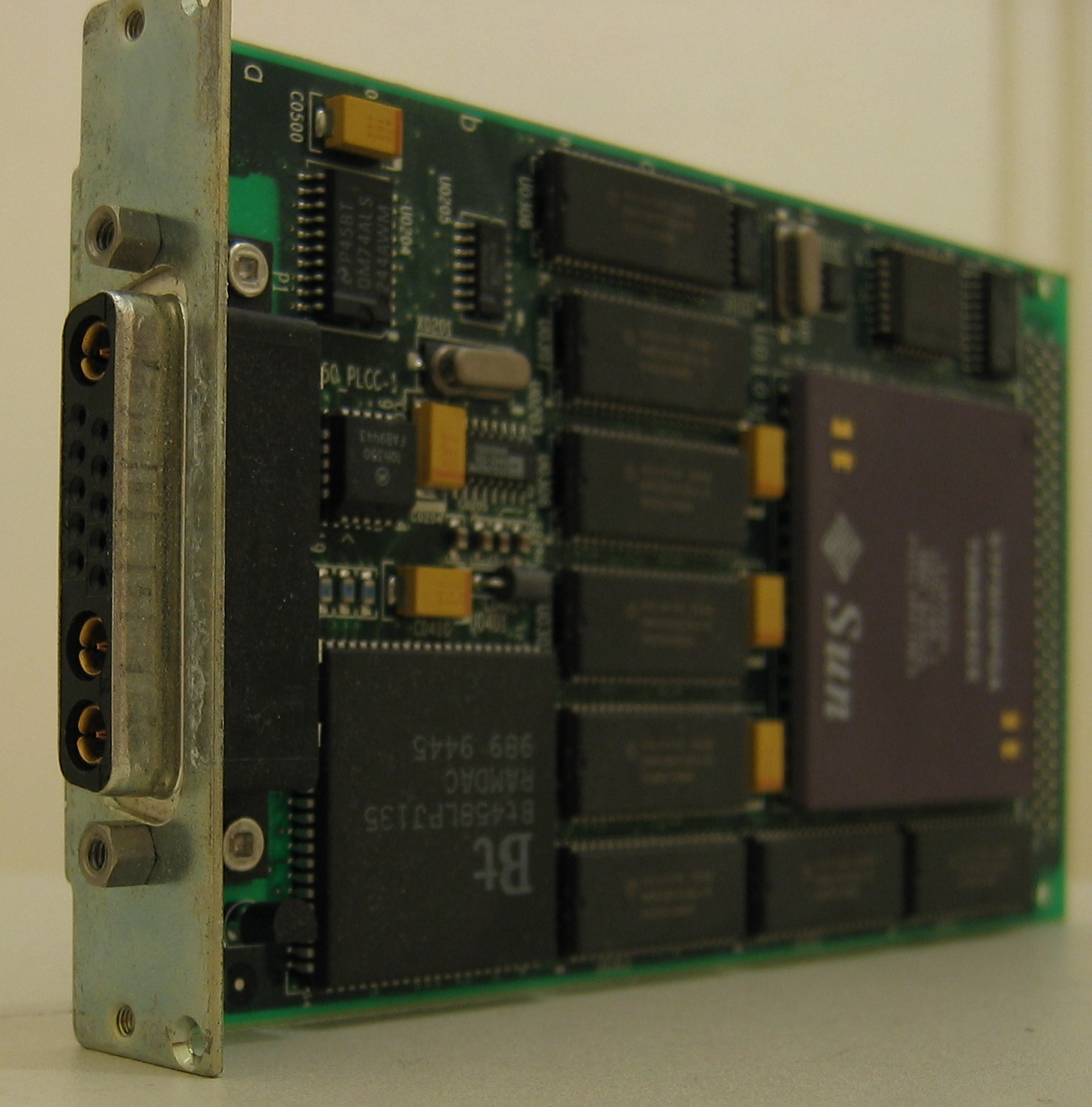
A Sun cgsix framebuffer

Framebuffers used in personal and home computing often had sets of defined modes under which the framebuffer can operate. These modes reconfigure the hardware to output different resolutions, color depths, memory layouts and refresh rate timings.

In the world of Unix machines and operating systems, such conveniences were usually eschewed in favor of directly manipulating the hardware settings. This manipulation was far more flexible in that any resolution, color depth and refresh rate was attainable – limited only by the memory available to the framebuffer.

An unfortunate side-effect of this method was that the display device could be driven beyond its capabilities. In some cases, this resulted in hardware damage to the display. More commonly, it simply produced garbled and unusable output. Modern CRT monitors fix this problem through the introduction of protection circuitry. When the display mode is changed, the monitor attempts to obtain a signal lock on the new refresh frequency. If the monitor is unable to obtain a signal lock or if the signal is outside the range of its design limitations, the monitor will ignore the framebuffer signal and possibly present the user with an error message.

LCD monitors tend to contain similar protection circuitry, but for different reasons. Since the LCD must digitally sample the display signal (thereby emulating an electron beam), any signal that is out of range cannot be physically displayed on the monitor.

== Color palette ==
Framebuffers have traditionally supported a wide variety of color modes. Due to the expense of memory, most early framebuffers used 1-bit (2 colors per pixel), 2-bit (4 colors), 4-bit (16 colors) or 8-bit (256 colors) color depths. The problem with such small color depths is that a full range of colors cannot be produced. The solution to this problem was indexed color, which adds a lookup table to the framebuffer. Each color stored in framebuffer memory acts as a color index. The lookup table serves as a palette with a limited number of different colors, while the rest is used as an index table.

Here is a typical indexed 256-color image and its own palette (shown as a rectangle of swatches):

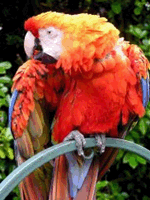

In some designs, it was also possible to write data to the lookup table (or switch between existing palettes) on the fly, allowing dividing the picture into horizontal bars with their own palette and thus rendering an image that had a far wider palette. For example, in an outdoor photograph, the picture could be divided into four bars: the top one with emphasis on sky tones, the next with foliage tones, the next with skin and clothing tones, and the bottom one with ground colors. This required each palette to have overlapping colors, but, carefully done, allowed great flexibility.

== Memory access ==
While framebuffers are commonly accessed via a memory mapping directly to the CPU memory space, this is not the only method by which they may be accessed. Framebuffers have varied widely in the methods used to access memory. Some of the most common are:

- Mapping the entire framebuffer to a given memory range.
- Port commands to set each pixel, range of pixels or palette entry.
- Mapping a memory range smaller than the framebuffer memory, then bank switching as necessary.

The framebuffer organization may be packed pixel or planar. The framebuffer may be all points addressable or have restrictions on how it can be updated.

== RAM on the video card ==
Video cards always have a certain amount of RAM. A small portion of this RAM is where the bitmap of image data is "buffered" for display. The term frame buffer is thus often used interchangeably when referring to this RAM.

The CPU sends image updates to the video card. The video processor on the card forms a picture of the screen image and stores it in the frame buffer as a large bitmap in RAM. The bitmap in RAM is used by the card to continually refresh the screen image.

== Virtual framebuffers ==
Many systems attempt to emulate the function of a framebuffer device, often for reasons of compatibility. The two most common virtual framebuffers are the Linux framebuffer device (fbdev) and the X Virtual Framebuffer (Xvfb). Xvfb was added to the X Window System distribution to provide a method for running X without a graphical framebuffer. The Linux framebuffer device was developed to abstract the physical method for accessing the underlying framebuffer into a guaranteed memory map that is easy for programs to access. This increases portability, as programs are not required to deal with systems that have disjointed memory maps or require bank switching.

== Page flipping ==
A frame buffer may be designed with enough memory to store two frames' worth of video data. In a technique known generally as double buffering or more specifically as page flipping, the framebuffer uses half of its memory to display the current frame. While that memory is being displayed, the other half of the memory is filled with data for the next frame. Once the secondary buffer is filled, the framebuffer is instructed to display the secondary buffer instead. The primary buffer becomes the secondary buffer, and the secondary buffer becomes the primary. This switch is often done after the vertical blanking interval to avoid screen tearing where half the old frame and half the new frame is shown together.

Page flipping has become a standard technique used by PC game programmers.

== Graphics accelerators ==
As the demand for better graphics increased, hardware manufacturers created a way to decrease the amount of CPU time required to fill the framebuffer. This is commonly called graphics acceleration. Common graphics drawing commands (many of them geometric) are sent to the graphics accelerator in their raw form. The accelerator then rasterizes the results of the command to the framebuffer. This method frees the CPU to do other work.

Early accelerators focused on improving the performance of 2D GUI systems. While retaining these 2D capabilities, most modern accelerators focus on producing 3D imagery in real time. A common design uses a graphics library such as OpenGL or Direct3D, which interfaces with the graphics driver to translate received commands to instructions for the accelerator's graphics processing unit (GPU). The GPU uses those instructions to compute the rasterized results and the results are bit blitted to the framebuffer. The framebuffer's signal is then produced in combination with built-in video overlay devices (usually used to produce the mouse cursor without modifying the framebuffer's data) and any final special effects that are produced by modifying the output signal. An example of such final special effects was the spatial anti-aliasing technique used by the 3dfx Voodoo cards. These cards add a slight blur to the output signal that makes aliasing of the rasterized graphics much less obvious.

At one time there were many manufacturers of graphics accelerators, including: 3dfx Interactive; ATI; Hercules; Trident; Nvidia; Radius; S3 Graphics; SiS and Silicon Graphics. As of 2015 the market for graphics accelerators for x86-based systems is dominated by Nvidia (acquired 3dfx in 2002), AMD (who acquired ATI in 2006), and Intel.

== Comparisons ==
With a framebuffer, the electron beam (if the display technology uses one) is commanded to perform a raster scan, the way a television renders a broadcast signal. The color information for each point thus displayed on the screen is pulled directly from the framebuffer during the scan, creating a set of discrete picture elements, i.e., pixels.

Framebuffers differ significantly from the vector displays that were common prior to the advent of raster graphics (and, consequently, to the concept of a framebuffer). With a vector display, only the vertices of the graphics primitives are stored. The electron beam of the output display is then commanded to move from vertex to vertex, tracing a line across the area between these points.

Likewise, framebuffers differ from the technology used in early text mode displays, where a buffer holds codes for characters, not individual pixels. The video display device performs the same raster scan as with a framebuffer but generates the pixels of each character in the buffer as it directs the beam.

== See also ==
- Bit plane
- Scanline rendering
- Swap chain
- Tile-based video game
- Tiled rendering
- Tektronix 4050 used a storage tube to eliminate the need for framebuffer memory
