= Swap chain =

Series of virtual framebuffers used by computer graphics systems

In computer graphics, a swap chain (also swapchain) is a series of virtual framebuffers used by the graphics card and graphics API for frame rate stabilization, stutter reduction, and several other purposes. Because of these benefits, many graphics APIs require the use of a swap chain. The swap chain usually exists in graphics memory, but it can exist in system memory as well. A swap chain with two buffers is a kind of double buffer.

== Function ==
A graphical depiction of a triple-buffered swap chain.

In every swap chain there are at least two buffers. The first framebuffer, the screenbuffer, is the buffer that is rendered to the output of the video card. The remaining buffers are known as backbuffers. Each time a new frame is displayed, the first backbuffer in the swap chain takes the place of the screenbuffer, this is called presentation or swapping. A variety of other actions may be taken on the previous screenbuffer and other backbuffers (if they exist). The screenbuffer may be simply overwritten or returned to the back of the swap chain for further processing. The action taken is decided by the client application and is API dependent.

== Direct3D ==
Microsoft Direct3D implements a SwapChain class. Each host device has at least one swap chain assigned to it, and others may be created by the client application. The API provides three methods of swapping: copy, discard, and flip. When the SwapChain is set to flip, the screenbuffer is copied onto the last backbuffer, then all the existing backbuffers are copied forward in the chain. When copy is set, each backbuffer is copied forward, but the screenbuffer is not wrapped to the last buffer, leaving it unchanged. Flip does not work when there is only one backbuffer, as the screenbuffer is copied over the only backbuffer before it can be presented. In discard mode, the driver selects the best method.

== Comparison with triple buffering ==
Outside the context of Direct3D, triple buffering refers to the technique of allowing an application to draw to whichever back buffer was least recently updated. This allows the application to always proceed with rendering, regardless of the pace at which frames are being drawn by the application or the pace at which frames are being sent to the display. Triple buffering may result in a frame being discarded without being displayed if two or more newer frames are completely rendered in the time it takes for one frame to be sent to the display. By contrast, Direct3D swap chains are a strict first-in, first-out queue, so every frame that is drawn by the application will be displayed even if newer frames are available. Direct3D does not implement a most-recent buffer swapping strategy, and Microsoft's documentation calls a Direct3D swap chain of three buffers "triple buffering". Triple buffering as described above is superior for interactive purposes such as gaming, but Direct3D swap chains of more than three buffers can be better for tasks such as presenting frames of a video where the time taken to decode each frame may be highly variable.
