= DirectX Graphics Infrastructure =

User-mode component of Microsoft Windows

DirectX Graphics Infrastructure (DXGI) is a user-mode component of Microsoft Windows (for Windows Vista and above) which provides a mapping between particular graphics APIs such as Direct3D 10.0 and above (known in DXGI parlance as producers) and the graphics kernel, which in turn interfaces with the user-mode Windows Display Driver Model driver. DXGI provides objects for tasks such as enumerating graphics adapters and monitors, enumerating display modes, choosing buffer formats, sharing resources between processes (such as between applications and the Desktop Window Manager), and presenting rendered frames to a window or monitor for display.

Both Direct3D 10 and OpenGL applications in Windows Vista work through DXGI.

Windows 8 introduced a notably useful DXGI-based API called Desktop Duplication API for hardware accelerated video capture using DirectX. Using it with a hardware video encoder provides a low-latency, high-performance solution for screen capturing and encoding, freeing up the CPU for gaming or other tasks such as Miracast screencasting, streaming, remote desktop scenarios.

DXGI 1.1 added surface sharing between the various Windows graphics API. The newest version is DXGI 1.6, introduced with Windows 10 Creators Update and updated with Windows 10 Fall Creators Update.

DXGI 2 preview was released alongside the Oculus Rift SDK, containing improvements for stereoscopic rendering.

DirectX Graphics Infrastructure(''DXGI") is a Microsoft Windows graphics infrastructure that provides support for low level graphics API shared operations. It offers the ability to enumerate graphics adapters and the supported display modes, select buffer formats, share graphics resources between processes, and present the frames rendered to the displays.The Direct3D 10 graphics architecture is the introduction of DXGI, which takes care of these low-level tasks, and it is a separation from the Direct3D runtime.

== See also ==
- Quartz Compositor
