= Hybrid Scheduling =

Hybrid Scheduling is a class of scheduling mechanisms that mix different scheduling criteria or disciplines in one algorithm. For example, scheduling uplink and downlink traffic in a WLAN (Wireless Local Area Network, such as IEEE 802.11e) using a single discipline or framework is an instance of hybrid scheduling. Other examples include a scheduling scheme that can provide differentiated and integrated (guaranteed) services in one discipline. Another example could be scheduling of node communications where centralized communications and distributed communications coexist. Further examples of such schedulers are found in the following articles:

1- Y. Pourmohammadi Fallah, H. Alnuweiri,"Hybrid Polling and Contention Access Scheduling in IEEE 802.11e WLANs", Journal of Parallel and Distributed Computing, Elsevier, Vol 67, Issue 2, Feb. 2007, pp. 242–256.
