= Multiple buffering =

Use of more than one buffer to hold a block of data

Sets 1, 2 and 3 represent the operation of single, double and triple buffering, respectively, with vertical synchronization (vsync) enabled. In each graph, time flows from left to right. Note that 3 shows a swap chain with three buffers; the original definition of triple buffering would throw away frame C as soon as frame D finished, and start drawing frame E into buffer 1 with no delay. Set 4 shows what happens when a frame (B, in this case) takes longer than normal to draw. In this case, a frame update is missed. In time-sensitive implementations such as video playback, the whole frame may be dropped. With a three-buffer swap chain in set 5, drawing of frame B can start without having to wait for frame A to be copied to video memory, reducing the chance of a delayed frame missing its vertical retrace.

In computer science, multiple buffering is the use of more than one buffer to hold a block of data, so that a "reader" will see a complete (though perhaps old) version of the data instead of a partially updated version of the data being created by a "writer". It is very commonly used for computer display images. It is also used to avoid the need to use dual-ported RAM (DPRAM) when the readers and writers are different devices.

== Description ==
=== Double buffering Petri net ===
The Petri net in the illustration shows double buffering. Transitions W1 and W2 represent writing to buffer 1 and 2 respectively while R1 and R2 represent reading from buffer 1 and 2 respectively. At the beginning, only the transition W1 is enabled. After W1 fires, R1 and W2 are both enabled and can proceed in parallel. When they finish, R2 and W1 proceed in parallel and so on.

After the initial transient where W1 fires alone, this system is periodic and the transitions are enabled – always in pairs (R1 with W2 and R2 with W1 respectively).

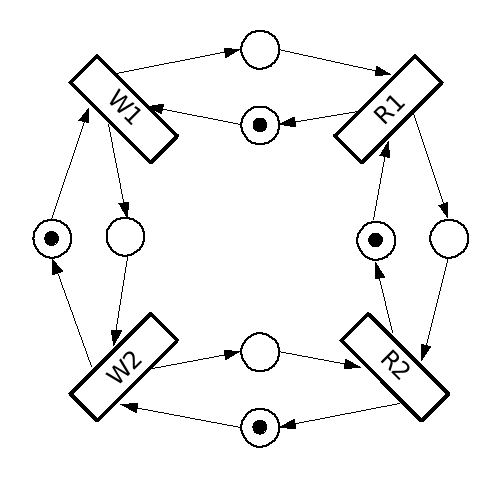
Double Buffering Petri Net

== Double buffering in computer graphics ==
In computer graphics, double buffering is a technique for drawing graphics that shows less stutter, tearing, and other artifacts.

It is difficult for a program to draw a display so that pixels do not change more than once. For instance, when updating a page of text, it is much easier to clear the entire page and then draw the letters than to somehow erase only the pixels that are used in old letters but not in new ones. However, this intermediate image is seen by the user as flickering. In addition, computer monitors constantly redraw the visible video page (traditionally at around 60 times a second), so even a perfect update may be visible momentarily as a horizontal divider between the "new" image and the un-redrawn "old" image, known as tearing.

=== Software double buffering ===
A software implementation of double buffering has all drawing operations store their results in some region of system RAM; any such region is often called a "back buffer". When all drawing operations are considered complete, the whole region (or only the changed portion) is copied into the video RAM (the "front buffer"); this copying is usually synchronized with the monitor's raster beam in order to avoid tearing. Software implementations of double buffering necessarily require more memory and CPU time than single buffering because of the system memory allocated for the back buffer, the time for the copy operation, and the time waiting for synchronization.

Compositing window managers often combine the "copying" operation with "compositing" used to position windows, transform them with scale or warping effects, and make portions transparent. Thus, the "front buffer" may contain only the composite image seen on the screen, while there is a different "back buffer" for every window containing the non-composited image of the entire window contents.

=== Page flipping ===
In the page-flip method, instead of copying the data, both buffers are capable of being displayed. At any one time, one buffer is actively being displayed by the monitor, while the other, background buffer is being drawn. When the background buffer is complete, the roles of the two are switched. The page-flip is typically accomplished by modifying a hardware register in the video display controller, i.e. the value of a pointer to the beginning of the display data in the video memory.

The page-flip is much faster than copying the data and can guarantee that tearing will not be seen as long as the pages are switched over during the monitor's vertical blanking interval –the blank period when no video data is being drawn. The currently active and visible buffer is called the front buffer, while the background page is called the back buffer.

== Triple buffering ==
In computer graphics, triple buffering is similar to double buffering but can provide improved performance. In double buffering, the program must wait until the finished drawing is copied or swapped before starting the next drawing. This waiting period could be several milliseconds during which neither buffer can be touched.

In triple buffering, the program has two back buffers and can immediately start drawing in the one that is not involved in such copying. The third buffer, the front buffer, is read by the graphics card to display the image on the monitor. Once the image has been sent to the monitor, the front buffer is flipped with (or copied from) the back buffer holding the most recent complete image. Since one of the back buffers is always complete, the graphics card never has to wait for the software to complete. Consequently, the software and the graphics card are completely independent and can run at their own pace. Finally, the displayed image was started without waiting for synchronization and thus with minimum lag.

Due to the software algorithm not polling the graphics hardware for monitor refresh events, the algorithm may continuously draw additional frames as fast as the hardware can render them. For frames that are completed much faster than interval between refreshes, it is possible to replace a back buffers' frames with newer iterations multiple times before copying. This means frames may be written to the back buffer that are never used at all before being overwritten by successive frames. Nvidia has implemented this method under the name "Fast Sync".

An alternative method sometimes referred to as triple buffering is a swap chain three buffers long. After the program has drawn both back buffers, it waits until the first one is placed on the screen, before drawing another back buffer (i.e. it is a 3-long first in, first out queue). Most Windows games seem to refer to this method when enabling triple buffering.

== Quad buffering ==
The term quad buffering is the use of double buffering for each of the left and right eye images in stereoscopic implementations, thus four buffers total (if triple buffering was used then there would be six buffers). The command to swap or copy the buffer typically applies to both pairs at once, so at no time does one eye see an older image than the other eye.

Quad buffering requires special support in the graphics card drivers which is disabled for most consumer cards. AMD's Radeon HD 6000 Series and newer support it.

3D standards like OpenGL and Direct3D support quad buffering.

== Double buffering for DMA ==
The term double buffering is used for copying data between two buffers for direct memory access (DMA) transfers, not for enhancing performance, but to meet specific addressing requirements of a device (particularly 32-bit devices on systems with wider addressing provided via Physical Address Extension). Windows device drivers are a place where the term "double buffering" is likely to be used. Linux and BSD source code calls these "bounce buffers".

Some programmers try to avoid this kind of double buffering with zero-copy techniques.

== Other uses ==
Double buffering is also used as a technique to facilitate interlacing or deinterlacing of video signals.

== See also ==
- Adaptive tile refresh
- Vertical synchronization
- Stereoscopy
- LC shutter glasses
- Nvidia 3D Vision
- Virtual DMA Services (VDS)
