= Windows Advanced Rasterization Platform =

Component of DirectX graphics runtime

Windows Advanced Rasterization Platform (WARP) is a software rasterizer and a component of the DirectX graphics runtime in Windows 7 and later. It is available for Windows Vista and Windows Server 2008 through the Platform Update for Windows Vista.

WARP can be used when no compatible hardware is available, in kernel mode applications or in a headless environment, or for remote rendering of Direct2D/DirectWrite for Remote Desktop Connection clients.

WARP is a fully featured Direct3D 10.1 renderer device with performance on par with low-end graphics cards, such as Intel GMA 3000, when running on multi-core CPUs. To achieve this level of rendering performance, WARP employs advanced techniques such as just-in-time compilation to x86 machine code and support for advanced vector extensions such as SSE2 and SSE4.1. Since Windows 7 SP1, the WARP supports AVX.

WARP supports the Direct3D 11 runtime and is compatible with feature levels 10_1, 10_0, 9_3, 9_2, and 9_1. Under the Direct3D 11.1 runtime, WARP also supports feature levels 11_0 and 11_1.

In Windows 8, WARP provides functionality for the Microsoft Basic Render Driver, which replaces the kernel-mode VGA driver. In Windows 8.1, WARP has been updated to support feature level 11_1 and tiled resources.

In Windows 10, WARP was updated to support Direct3D 12 at feature level 12_1. Under Direct3D 12, WARP also replaces the Reference rasterizer.

In Windows 11, WARP was updated to support feature level 12_2 (DirectX 12 Ultimate) with variable rate shading, sampler feedback, mesh shaders, and DirectX Raytracing. Microsoft releases recent versions of d3d10warp.dll as a downloadable NuGet package, which can be side-loaded by applications and can work with the redistributable Direct3D 12 runtime (Agility SDK).
