= Schlick's approximation =

Lighting formula in 3D computer graphics

In 3D computer graphics, Schlick's approximation, named after Christophe Schlick, is a formula for approximating the contribution of the Fresnel factor in the specular reflection of light from a non-conducting interface (surface) between two media.

According to Schlick's model, the specular reflection coefficient R can be approximated by:
$$R(\theta) = R_0 + (1 - R_0)(1 - \cos \theta)^5$$
where
$$R_0 = \left(\frac{n_1-n_2}{n_1+n_2}\right)^2$$
where $\theta$ is, depending on usage, either half of the angle between the incoming and outgoing light vectors, or the angle between the surface normal and the light or view vector. And $n_1,\,n_2$ are the indices of refraction of the two media at the interface and $R_0$ is the reflection coefficient for light incoming parallel to the normal (i.e., the value of the Fresnel term when $\theta = 0$ or minimal reflection). In computer graphics, one medium is usually air, meaning that $n_1$ can be approximated very well as 1.

In microfacet models it is assumed that there is always a perfect reflection, but that the normal changes according to a certain distribution, resulting in a non-perfect overall reflection. When using Schlick's approximation as an energy conservation weighting term, the normal in the above computation is replaced by the halfway vector. Either the viewing or light direction can be used as the second vector.

== Usage ==
Brent Burley made use of Schlick in his development of the Disney Principled Shader, or Disney BSDF, which he presented at SIGGRAPH in 2012. This was used for Wreck-It Ralph (2012), and was also adopted by the Unreal Engine from UE4 onwards for its standard default lit material. As a result, it has become very widely used in modern video games. Schlick remains present in Unreal Engine 5's Substrate material pipeline.

== See also ==
- Phong reflection model
- Blinn-Phong shading model
- Fresnel equations
