= Reflection (computer graphics) =

Simulation of reflective surfaces

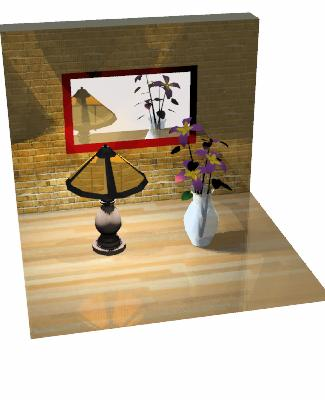
Ray-traced model demonstrating specular reflection

Reflection in computer graphics is used to render reflective objects like mirrors and shiny surfaces.

Accurate reflections are commonly computed using ray tracing whereas approximate reflections can usually be computed faster by using simpler methods such as environment mapping. Reflections on shiny surfaces like wood or tile can add to the photorealistic effects of a 3D rendering.

== Approaches to reflection rendering ==
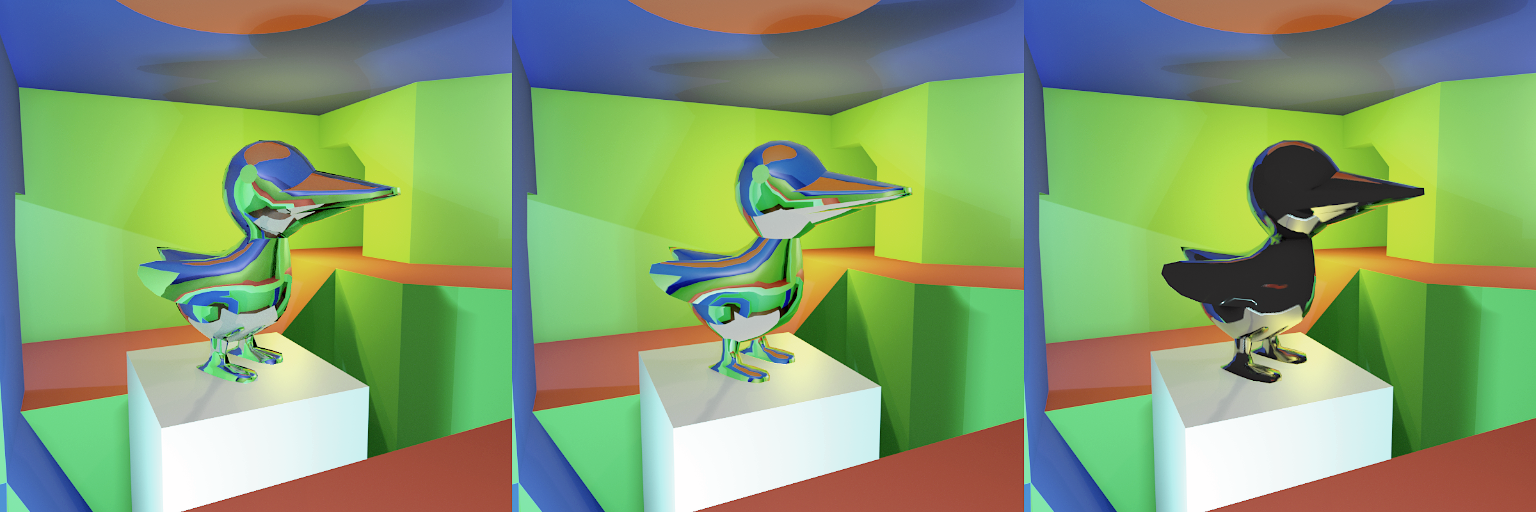
Comparison of accurate reflections computed with path tracing (left), approximate reflections with environment mapping (middle), and screen space reflections (right)

For rendering environment reflections there exist many techniques that differ in precision, computational and implementation complexity. Combination of these techniques are also possible.

Image order rendering algorithms based on tracing rays of light, such as ray tracing or path tracing, typically compute accurate reflections on general surfaces, including multiple reflections and self reflections. However these algorithms are generally still too computationally expensive for real time rendering (even though specialized hardware exists, such as Nvidia RTX) and require a different rendering approach from typically used rasterization.

Reflections on planar surfaces, such as planar mirrors or water surfaces, can be computed simply and accurately in real time with two pass rendering — one for the viewer, one for the view in the mirror, usually with the help of stencil buffer. Some older video games used a trick to achieve this effect with one pass rendering by putting the whole mirrored scene behind a transparent plane representing the mirror.

Reflections on non-planar (curved) surfaces are more challenging for real time rendering. Main approaches that are used include:

- Environment mapping (e.g. cube mapping): a technique that has been widely used e.g. in video games, offering reflection approximation that's mostly sufficient to the eye, but lacking self-reflections and requiring pre-rendering of the environment map. The precision can be increased by using a spatial array of environment maps instead of just one. It is also possible to generate cube map reflections in real time, at the cost of memory and computational requirements.
- Screen space reflections (SSR): a more expensive technique that traces rays come from pixel data.This requires the data of surface normal and either depth buffer (local space) or position buffer (world space).The disadvantage is that objects not captured in the rendered frame cannot appear in the reflections, which results in unresolved and or false intersections causing artefacts such as reflection vanishment and virtual image. SSR was originally introduced as Real Time Local Reflections in CryENGINE 3.

== Types of reflection ==
Polished

- A polished reflection is an undisturbed reflection, like a mirror or chrome surface.

Blurry

- A blurry reflection means that tiny random bumps, or microfacets, on the surface of the material causes the reflection to be blurry.

Metallic

- A reflection is metallic if the highlights and reflections retain the color of the reflective object.

Glossy

- This term can be misused: sometimes, it is a setting which is the opposite of blurry (e.g. when "glossiness" has a low value, the reflection is blurry). Sometimes the term is used as a synonym for "blurred reflection". Glossy used in this context means that the reflection is actually blurred.

=== Polished or mirror reflection ===
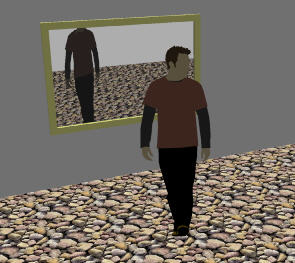
Mirror on wall rendered with 100% reflection

Mirrors are usually almost 100% reflective.

=== Metallic reflection ===
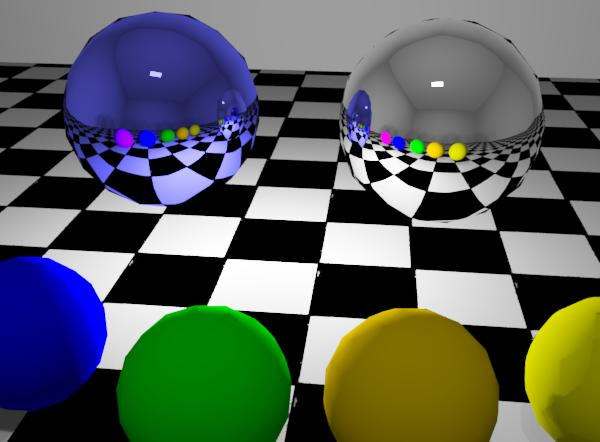
The large sphere on the left is blue with its reflection marked as metallic. The large sphere on the right is the same color but does not have the metallic property selected.

Normal (nonmetallic) objects reflect light and colors in the original color of the object being reflected. Metallic objects reflect lights and colors altered by the color of the metallic object itself. In physically based rendering, metals are treated as conductors: light not reflected at the surface is rapidly absorbed, so metallic specular reflection is typically tinted by the metal and has little or no diffuse component, whereas non-metallic specular reflection is usually untinted.

=== Blurry reflection ===
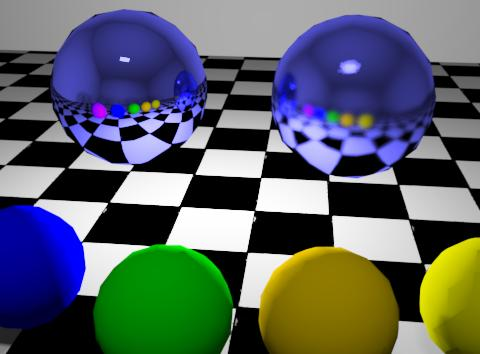
The large sphere on the left has sharpness set to 100%. The sphere on the right has sharpness set to 50% which creates a blurry reflection.

Many materials are imperfect reflectors, where the reflections are blurred to various degrees due to surface roughness that scatters the rays of the reflections.

=== Glossy reflection ===
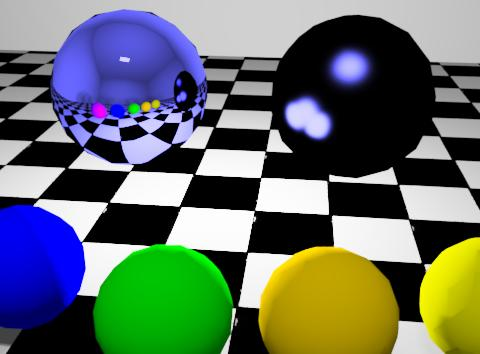
The sphere on the left has normal, metallic reflection. The sphere on the right has the same parameters, except that the reflection is marked as "glossy".

Fully glossy reflection, shows highlights from light sources, but does not show a clear reflection from objects.

== Examples of reflections ==
=== Wet floor reflections ===
The wet floor effect is a graphic effects technique popular in conjunction with Web 2.0 style pages, particularly in logos. The effect can be done manually or created with an auxiliary tool which can be installed to create the effect automatically. Unlike a standard computer reflection (and the Java water effect popular in first-generation web graphics), the wet floor effect involves a gradient and often a slant in the reflection, so that the mirrored image appears to be hovering over or resting on a wet floor.

== See also ==
- Illumination model
- Lambertian reflectance
- Phong reflection model
- Ray tracing
- Reflection mapping
- Rendering (computer graphics)
- Specular reflection (optics)
- Specular highlight
