= Malibu Painter =

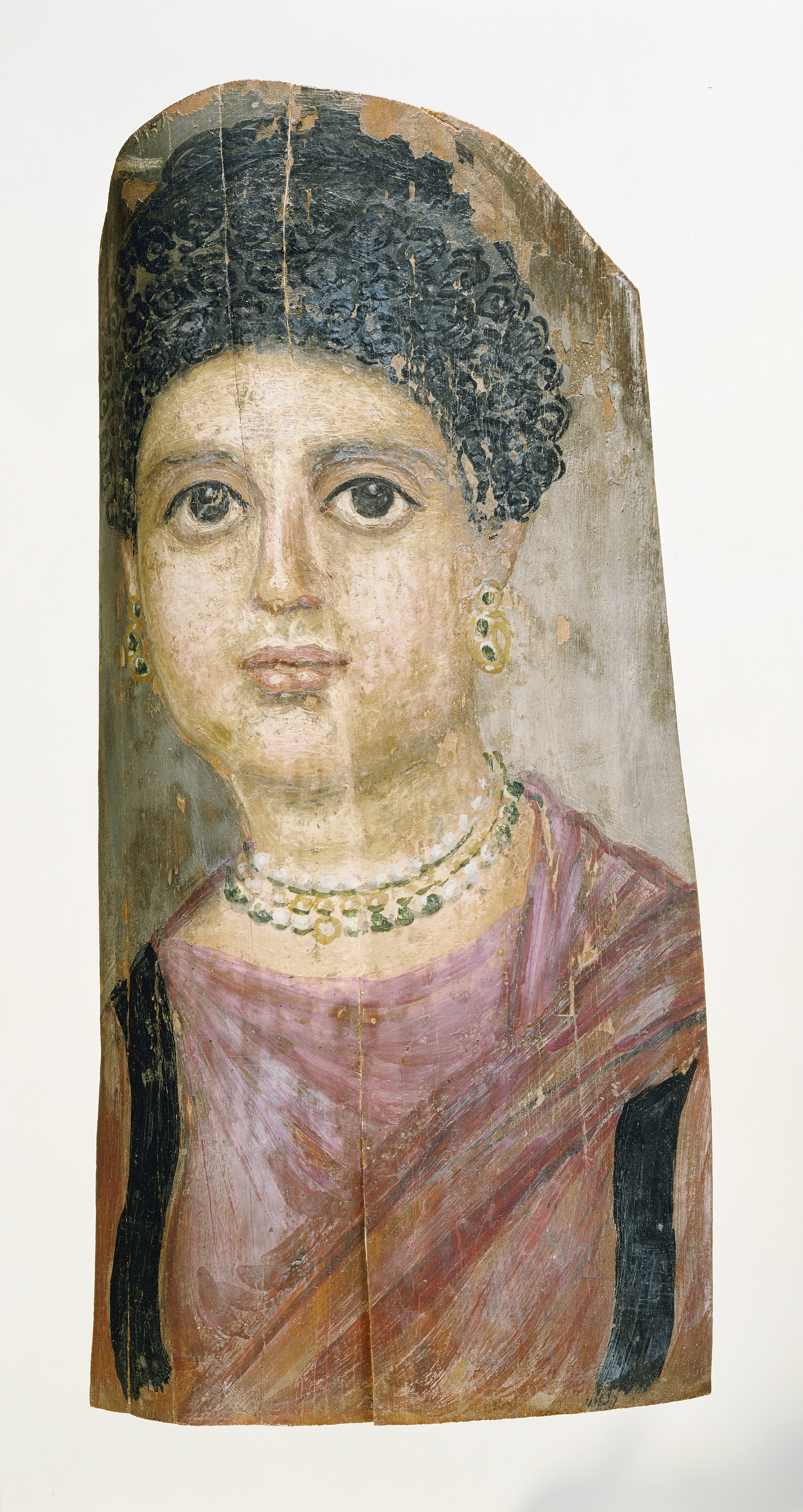
Mummy portrait attributed to the Malibu Painter

The Malibu Painter was an Ancient Roman painter of Fayum mummy portraits active in Egypt between about 75 and 100 AD. Three portraits have been attributed to him, based on his manner of painting highlights and shadow and the distinctive form of the noses and mouths in his portraits. Two paintings were found at Hawara, and it appears that the painter was primarily active in nearby Arsinoe. The artist's name is derived from a portrait of a woman now found in the J. Paul Getty Museum in Malibu, Los Angeles.

== See also ==
- Notname: name of convenience for an artist
