= Vertex normal =

Directional vector associated with a vertex

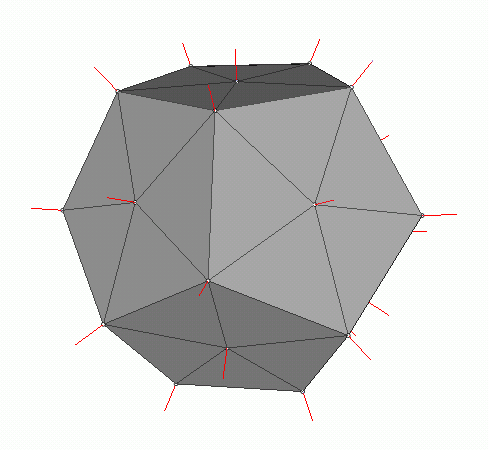
Vertex normals of a dodecahedral mesh.

In the geometry of computer graphics, a vertex normal at a vertex of a polyhedron is a directional vector associated with a vertex, intended as a replacement to the true geometric normal of the surface. Commonly, it is computed as the normalized average of the surface normals of the faces that contain that vertex. The average can be weighted for example by the area of the face or it can be unweighted. Vertex normals can also be computed for polygonal approximations to surfaces such as NURBS, or specified explicitly for artistic purposes. Vertex normals are used in Gouraud shading, Phong shading and other lighting models. Using vertex normals, much smoother shading than flat shading can be achieved; however, without some modifications to topology such as support loops, it cannot produce a sharper edge.

== See also ==
- Specular highlight
- Per-pixel lighting
