= Gouraud shading =

Interpolation method in computer graphics

Single triangle rendered with Gouraud shading

Gouraud shading (/ɡuːˈroʊ/ goo-ROH), named after Henri Gouraud, is an interpolation method used in computer graphics to produce continuous shading of surfaces represented by polygon meshes. In practice, Gouraud shading is most often used to achieve continuous lighting on triangle meshes by computing the lighting at the corners of each triangle and linearly interpolating the resulting colours for each pixel covered by the triangle. Gouraud first published the technique in 1971. However, enhanced hardware support for superior shading models has yielded Gouraud shading largely obsolete in modern rendering.

== Description ==
Gouraud shading works as follows: An estimate to the surface normal of each vertex in a polygonal 3D model is either specified for each vertex or found by averaging the surface normals of the polygons that meet at each vertex. Using these estimates, lighting computations based on a reflection model, e.g. the Phong reflection model, are then performed to produce colour intensities at the vertices. For each screen pixel that is covered by the polygonal mesh, colour intensities can then be interpolated from the colour values calculated at the vertices.

== Comparison with other shading techniques ==
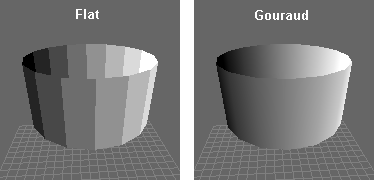
Comparison of flat shading and Gouraud shading

Gouraud shading is considered superior to flat shading and requires significantly less processing than Phong shading, but usually results in a faceted look.

In comparison to Phong shading, Gouraud shading's strength and weakness lies in its interpolation. If a mesh covers more pixels in screen space than it has vertices, interpolating colour values from samples of expensive lighting calculations at vertices is less processor intensive than performing the lighting calculation for each pixel as in Phong shading. However, highly localized lighting effects (such as specular highlights, e.g. the glint of reflected light on the surface of an apple) will not be rendered correctly, and if a highlight lies in the middle of a polygon, but does not spread to the polygon's vertex, it will not be apparent in a Gouraud rendering; conversely, if a highlight occurs at the vertex of a polygon, it will be rendered correctly at this vertex (as this is where the lighting model is applied), but will be spread unnaturally across all neighboring polygons via the interpolation method.

The problem is easily spotted in a rendering which ought to have a specular highlight moving smoothly across the surface of a model as it rotates. Gouraud shading will instead produce a highlight continuously fading in and out across neighboring portions of the model, peaking in intensity when the intended specular highlight aligns with a vertex of the model. While this problem can be fixed by increasing the density of vertices in the object, at some point the diminishing returns of this approach will favour switching to a more detailed shading model.

A Gouraud-shaded sphere-like mesh - note the poor behaviour of the specular highlight.

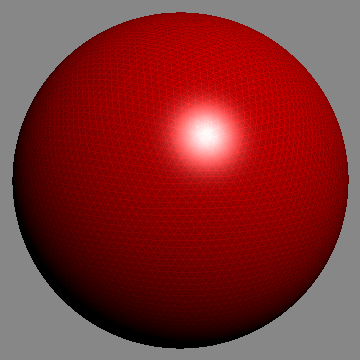
Another sphere-like mesh rendered with a higher polygon count

== Linear vs. hyperbolic interpolation ==
Gouraud's original paper described linear color interpolation. In 1992, James F. Blinn published an efficient algorithm for hyperbolic interpolation that is used in GPUs as a perspective correct alternative to linear interpolation. Both the linear and hyperbolic variants of interpolation of colors from vertices to pixels are commonly called "Gouraud shading".

== Mach bands ==
Any linear interpolation of intensity causes derivative discontinuities which triggers Mach bands, a common visual artifact of Gouraud shading.

== See also ==
- List of common shading algorithms
- Blinn–Phong reflection model
- Phong shading

== Games used in ==
Gouruad Shading is used in Roblox.
