= Bui Tuong Phong =

Vietnamese computer scientist (1942–1975)

Bùi Tường Phong
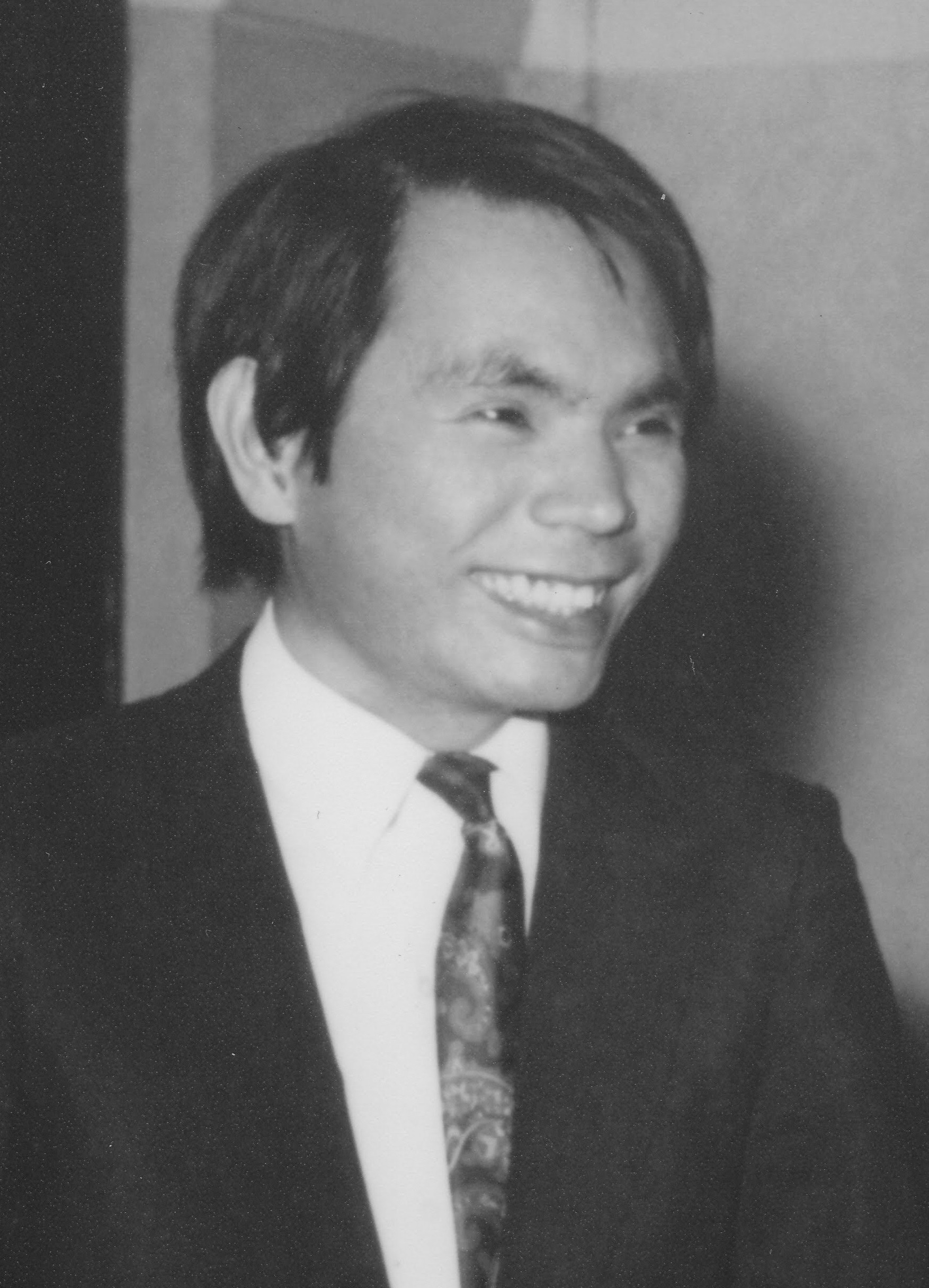
- Phong in 1969
- Born: December 14, 1942; Hanoi, Vietnam
- Died: July 1975 (aged 32); California, U.S.
- Education: University of Utah
- Known for: Phong reflection model; Phong shading
- Scientific career
- Fields: Computer science
- Doctoral advisor: David Evans

Bui Tuong Phong (December 14, 1942 – July 1975) was a Vietnamese-born computer graphics researcher and pioneer. He invented the widely used Phong shading algorithm and Phong reflection model.

== Life ==
Phong was born in Hanoi. After attending the Lycée Albert Sarraut there, he moved with his family to Saigon in 1954, where he attended the Lycée Jean Jacques Rousseau. He went to France in 1964 and was admitted to the Grenoble Institute of Technology. He received his licence ès sciences from Grenoble in 1966 and his Diplôme d'Ingénieur from the ENSEEIHT, Toulouse, in 1968. In 1968, he joined the Institut de recherche en informatique et en automatique (then IRIA) as a researcher in Computer Science, working in the development of operating systems for digital computers.

He went to the University of Utah College of Engineering in September 1971 as a research assistant in Computer Science and he received his Ph.D. from the University of Utah in 1973.

In 1975, after his tenure at the University of Utah, Phong joined Stanford University as a professor.

Phong was married to Bùi Thị Ngọc Bích from Nha Trang, Vietnam, in 1969 in Paris, France. He and his wife had one daughter.

According to Professor Ivan Sutherland and Phong's friends, Phong was intelligent, affable and modest. About improving the quality of synthesized images he wrote: "We do not expect to be able to display the object exactly as it would appear in reality, with texture, overcast shadows, etc. We hope only to display an image that approximates the real object closely enough to provide a certain degree of realism."

Two years after receiving his Ph.D., Phong died in 1975 from complications related to squamous cell carcinoma of the throat.

== Work on computer graphics ==
Phong was the inventor of the Phong reflection model and the Phong shading interpolation method, techniques widely used in computer graphics. He published the description of the algorithms in his 1973 PhD dissertation and a 1975 paper.

He developed the first algorithm for simulating specular phenomena. When working on his doctorate, he was very focused on selecting a topic and completing his dissertation very quickly. Professor David C. Evans very enthusiastically supported him in this project. Professor Ivan Sutherland worked with him for improving the previous Mach banding problems, and on using normals for shading. His fellow students also supported him very much, including James H. Clark, Franklin C. Crow, George Randall, Dennis Ting and John Riley. He finished his dissertation much faster than other students of the time did.

Phong, Robert McDermott, Jim Clark, and Raphael Rom created an early computer graphics rendering of a Volkswagen Beetle that closely resembled its physical counterpart. The image has since been reproduced in academic publications and used in computer graphics demonstrations .

== See also ==
- Blinn–Phong shading model
