= Henri Gouraud (computer scientist) =

French computer scientist (born 1944)

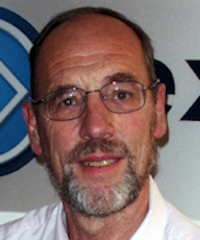
- Gouraud in 2007
- Born: 1944 (age 81–82); France
- Education: University of Utah; École Centrale Paris
- Known for: Gouraud Shading
- Scientific career
- Fields: Computer science
- Doctoral advisor: Ivan Sutherland

Henri Gouraud (French pronunciation: [ɑ̃ʁi ɡuʁo]; born 1944) is a French computer scientist. He is the inventor of Gouraud shading used in computer graphics. He is the great-nephew of French general Henri Gouraud.

During 1964–1967, he studied at École Centrale Paris. He received his Ph.D. from the University of Utah College of Engineering in 1971, working with Dave Evans and Ivan Sutherland, with his dissertation titled Computer Display of Curved Surfaces.

In 1971, Gouraud made the first computer graphics geometry capture and representation of a human face in wire-frame model, and applied his shader to produce the famous human face images showing the effect of his shading, which were done using his wife Sylvie Gouraud as the model.

== Original publications ==
- H. Gouraud, "Continuous shading of curved surfaces," IEEE Transactions on Computers, C-20(6):623–629, 1971.
- H. Gouraud, Computer Display of Curved Surfaces, Doctoral Thesis, University of Utah, United States, 1971.
- H. Gouraud, Continuous shading of curved surfaces. In Rosalee Wolfe (editor), Seminal Graphics: Pioneering efforts that shaped the field, ACM Press, 1998. ISBN 1-58113-052-X.
