= Call of Juarez =

First-person shooter series introduced in 2006

- Genre: First-person shooter
- Developer: Techland
- Publishers: Ubisoft (2006–2018); Techland (2018–)
- Creator: Paweł Selinger
- Artist: Paweł Selinger
- Writers: Paweł Selinger; Haris Orkin
- Composer: Paweł Błaszczak
- Platforms: PlayStation 3; Windows; Xbox 360; Nintendo Switch
- First release: Call of Juarez; September 15, 2006
- Latest release: Call of Juarez: Gunslinger; May 22, 2013

Call of Juarez is a first-person shooter video game franchise created by Paweł Selinger in 2006. Released primarily on Windows, PlayStation 3, and Xbox 360, there are four games in the series; Call of Juarez (2006), Call of Juarez: Bound in Blood (2009), Call of Juarez: The Cartel (2011), and Call of Juarez: Gunslinger (2013). Techland has developed all four games, and as of 2018, owns the publishing rights. From 2006 to 2018, Ubisoft held the publishing rights.

The original game takes place in Texas and Mexico in 1884 and tells the story of Reverend Ray McCall as he hunts down his nephew Billy, who has been wrongly accused of murdering his parents. Bound in Blood is a prequel to the first game and takes place in Georgia, Arkansas, Arizona, and Mexico from 1864 to 1866. It tells the story of how Ray and his brother Thomas went from being soldiers in the Confederate States Army to dangerous outlaws. The Cartel relocates the series from a Wild West milieu to 2011 Los Angeles and Mexico and depicts an interagency task force investigating a powerful Mexican drug cartel. This decision proved unpopular amongst fans, however, and Gunslinger returned to the West. Taking place from 1880 to 1910, and spread across Arizona, Colorado, Kansas, Missouri, Montana, New Mexico Territory, Wyoming, and Mexico, it tells the story of bounty hunter Silas Greaves and his encounters with many of the legends of the Wild West, including Billy the Kid, Jesse James, Butch Cassidy, the Sundance Kid, and the Dalton Gang.

From a gameplay perspective, all four games are first-person shooters, and feature several common game mechanics, such as "Concentration mode" (a slow motion technique which is slightly different from game to game) and duelling (in Bound in Blood and Gunslinger, duelling switches the game to a third-person perspective). The first three games in the series offer different player characters. For Gunslinger, there is only one player character, but the game does feature experience point-based skill trees which allow the player to customise their fighting style as they progress.

Critically, reactions to the games have been mixed, ranging from general praise for Bound in Blood and Gunslinger to generally unfavorable reviews for The Cartel. In terms of sales, the original game did not sell well in North America, moving only 137,000 units across both PC and Xbox 360. However, its European sales were considerably better, with Techland crediting the game as putting them "on the map". Bound in Blood sold better, moving 900,000 units across all systems in its first four months of release. Gunslinger also sold well, and was Ubisoft's second best-selling digital-only game of 2013.

== Games ==
Release timeline
2006	Call of Juarez
2007
2008
2009	Call of Juarez: Bound in Blood
2010
2011	Call of Juarez: The Cartel
2012
2013	Call of Juarez: Gunslinger

- Call of Juarez was developed by Techland and published in Europe for Windows by Focus Home Interactive in September 2006, in Australia by Auran Development in October 2006, and in North America by Ubisoft in June 2007. It was ported to the Xbox 360 by Techland in June 2007, published worldwide by Ubisoft. It was released on GOG.com in November 2018.
- Call of Juarez: Bound in Blood, a prequel to the original game, was developed by Techland for Windows, PlayStation 3, and Xbox 360. It was published by Ubisoft in North America in June 2009 and in Australia and Europe in July. In November 2018, it was added to Microsoft's backward compatibility program, making the game playable on the Xbox One and Xbox Series X/S. It was released on GOG.com in September 2019.
- Call of Juarez: The Cartel was developed by Techland for Windows, PlayStation 3, and Xbox 360. It was originally published by Ubisoft for PlayStation and Xbox in June 2011 and for Windows in September. In March 2018, The Cartel and Gunslinger were removed from Steam, the PlayStation Store, and Xbox Live. Two weeks later, Ubisoft explained that the reason for the removal was "per the terms of agreement, Call of Juarez: The Cartel and Call of Juarez: Gunslinger licensing/publishing rights have reverted back to Techland, while others remain active with Ubisoft. This is why a few titles have recently been removed." Gunslinger returned to all three platforms on April 30, and Techland promised that information on The Cartel's return would be provided "at a later date", but no such information was ever released, and the game remains unavailable on Steam, the PlayStation Store, and GOG.com. In November 2018, it was added to Microsoft's backward compatibility program, making the game playable on the Xbox One and Xbox Series X/S.
- Call of Juarez: Gunslinger was developed by Techland for Windows, PlayStation 3, and Xbox 360. It was originally published by Ubisoft in May 2013 via Steam, UPlay, the PlayStation Store, and Xbox Live Arcade. In March 2018, The Cartel and Gunslinger were removed from all digital stores. Two weeks later, Ubisoft explained that the reason for the removal was "per the terms of agreement, Call of Juarez: The Cartel and Call of Juarez: Gunslinger licensing/publishing rights have reverted back to Techland, while others remain active with Ubisoft. This is why a few titles have recently been removed." Gunslinger returned to all three platforms on April 30, with Techland stating, "as Techland Publishing moves forward as a leading publisher, we are delighted to welcome Call of Juarez: Gunslinger to our publishing division." In December 2019, the game was ported to the Nintendo Switch.

== Gameplay overview ==
=== Player characters ===
All four Call of Juarez games are first-person shooters. In the original game, the player controls alternating protagonists level-by-level - Billy 'Candle' and Ray McCall, each of whom has a different style of gameplay. Billy's levels are partially stealth-based, whereas Ray's are more traditional shoot 'em ups. In Bound in Blood, the player controls one of two protagonists - Ray McCall or his brother Thomas. Like in the first game, the two characters have different gameplay styles, but unlike in the first game, most levels offer the choice of which character to play as. The character which the player does not choose is controlled by the AI for the duration of the level. In The Cartel, the player controls one of three protagonists - Det. Ben McCall (LAPD), Agent Kim Evans (FBI), or Agent Eddie Guerra (DEA). The two characters whom the player does not choose are controlled either by the AI or by human player(s) in co-op mode. Whichever player the character picks at the start of the game, they must play through the whole game with that character. Playing as specific characters often results in different cutscenes and in-game dialogue. In Gunslinger, there is only one player character available - the bounty hunter Silas Greaves.

In the original game, the main difference between Ray and Billy is that Ray is stronger and slower, and can take considerably more damage than Billy. On the other hand, Billy can sneak up on enemies and perform silent kills. Billy can also use two weapons that Ray cannot - a bow and a whip. When he uses the bow, the game automatically goes into slow motion for a set period of time. The whip is weak as a weapon, and is mainly used to aid Billy when climbing. Unique to Ray is his ability to rapid-fire a single pistol (fanning) and his ability to wield and quote from a Bible.

In Bound in Blood, the biggest difference between Ray and Thomas is that Thomas can aim farther than Ray, but Ray is faster with pistols, which he can dual wield, and is quicker when aiming at nearby enemies. Ray can use two weapons that Thomas cannot – a dismountable gatling gun and throwable dynamite. Thomas can use three weapons that Ray cannot – a lasso, a bow, and throwing knives. When Thomas uses the bow, the player has the option of going into slow motion for more precise aiming, or firing in normal speed.

Screenshot of gameplay in Call of Juarez: The Cartel; the image shows the player controlling McCall, with both Evans and Guerra visible on screen as his AI-controlled partners.

In The Cartel, the difference between the three characters pertains to their weaponry. McCall gets a damage bonus when using handguns and heavy machine guns, whilst his speciality skill is rapid reloading of handguns. Evans gets a damage bonus when using rifles and sniper rifles, whilst her speciality skill is enhanced focus when zoomed in. Guerra gets a damage bonus when using light machine guns and shotguns, whilst his speciality skill is the ability to dual wield SMGs.

In Gunslinger, although there is only one player character, the game features an upgrade system which allows the player to customise Silas's fighting style. Every kill in the game is rewarded with experience points, and the player can increase their haul by achieving combos; multiple kills in quick succession which increase the combo score by one for each kill. These experience points allow the player to level up their skills via three skill trees; Gunslinger (focuses on pistols), Ranger (rifles), and Trapper (shotguns). After beating the game, the player can start a New Game+, carrying over their unlocked skills, which allows them to continue unlocking upgrades.

=== Concentration modes ===
Concentration mode in the original Call of Juarez

All four games feature some kind of slow-motion attack, a.k.a. "Concentration mode". In the original game, the player can activate concentration mode when playing as Ray. During combat, when he draws either handgun, concentration mode is automatically activated, and the game goes into slow motion, with two targeting reticles appearing on either side of the screen, each moving towards the centre. The player cannot control the movement of either reticle, nor can they move the character during concentration mode, but they can control the positioning of the screen, allowing them to manoeuvre Ray's stance to shoot when the reticles pass over an enemy.

In Bound in Blood, there are three types of concentration modes, which are available once the player has filled their concentration meter by killing enemies. In Ray's mode, once slow motion begins, Ray is free to rotate 360 degrees from a fixed position. If the crosshairs pass over an enemy, that enemy will be "tagged". Once the time is up, Ray automatically fires at all tagged enemies with near-perfect accuracy. In Thomas's concentration mode, the crosshairs automatically move from visible enemy to visible enemy, pausing on each one momentarily. As the crosshairs move, the player must hold down the fire button, and when the crosshairs pause, the player must pull back on the analog stick or mouse to fire at the target. The third type of concentration mode is dual concentration, which happens automatically at certain points of the game, always at doorways. Ray and Thomas simultaneously burst into the room, and the game goes into slow motion, operating in the same manner as Ray's concentration mode from the first game.

The Cartel features two types of concentration modes. Irrespective of the character, players charge their concentration metre by killing enemies, and once the meter is full, they can activate concentration mode at any time. When they do, time slows down dramatically, but the player can still pivot, shoot, and reload at near-normal speed. In co-op play, when one player triggers their concentration mode, it also triggers for all other human players. The second type of concentration mode is dual concentration, which happens automatically at certain points in the game, always at doorways. The player character and one of the AI characters (or two player characters in co-op mode) simultaneously burst into the room, and the game goes into slow motion for several seconds.

In Gunslinger there are multiple types of concentration modes. The standard mode is charged by killing enemies, and once activated, the game goes into slow motion and all enemies are automatically highlighted in red. Other forms of concentration mode include falls, door breaches, Quick Time Events (QTEs), and "Sense of Death". Falls and door breaches work the same way as normal concentration mode, except they automatically happen at certain locations irrespective of whether the player's concentration meter is charged. QTEs also happen automatically. Silas will automatically target an enemy and the player is required to press a specific button to shoot and kill that enemy. If done correctly, the reticle will automatically jump to the next enemy, and so on. For Sense of Death, as the player avoids game over, they fill their Sense of Death meter. When this meter is full, it will automatically activate when Silas is one shot away from death. When that shot is taken, the game will go into slow motion and the player can dodge left or right to try to avoid the fatal bullet.

=== Duelling ===
A duel in Bound in Blood

In the original game's duels, the player must wait for a countdown, at which point the enemy will reach for their weapon. Only then can Ray draw his own gun and fire. To draw Ray's gun, the player must move the mouse/analog stick downwards and then snap it upwards, at which point a reticule appears on screen which can be controlled as normal. Character movement during duels is limited to leaning left and right.

In Bound in Blood, duels switch the game to third-person, with the player needing to keep the character's hand as close to his gun as possible without touching it. At the same time, the player needs to keep the opponent lined up in the centre of the screen. When the time comes to draw, a bell rings, and the player must draw, aim, and fire as quickly as possible.

A duel in Gunslinger

In Gunslinger, duels also switch the game to third-person. The player must keep the constantly moving target over the enemy to increase their focus, and the higher the focus percentage, the smaller the gauge gets and the more precise the shot will be when taken. At the same time, the player must keep Silas's hand as close to his gun as possible to increase their speed, and the higher the speed percentage, the quicker the gun will be drawn. The player has two options in every duel - they can draw before their opponent and get a lower-scoring dishonourable kill or wait until the opponent has drawn and get a higher-scoring honourable kill.

=== Multiplayer ===
The original game's PC multiplayer mode features "Deathmatch", "Skirmish" (team deathmatch), "Robbery" (the team designated as "Outlaws" must find the hidden gold and return it to an "escape zone" without being caught by the team designated as "Lawmen"), and "Gold Rush" (gold is spread over the map; at the end of a specified time, the player who has collected the most gold wins). The Xbox 360 version also features "Capture the Bag", "Wanted" (one player is randomly designated as the "wanted" player, and other players can only score points by killing this particular player. Once the wanted player is killed, the player who killed them becomes the wanted player. The player with the most points at the end of the game wins), and "Famous Events" (game scenarios based on real-life events, such as the Gunfight at the O.K. Corral, the Wilcox Train Robbery, and the Coffeyville Bank Robbery).

Bound in Blood's multiplayer mode features "Shootout" (deathmatch), "Posse" (team deathmatch), "Wanted", "Manhunt" (team "wanted" game in which one player is randomly designated as the wanted player. If they survive sixty seconds, their team scores a point. If they are killed, the player who killed them becomes the wanted player. The team with the most points at the end of the game wins), and "Wild West Legends" (game scenarios based on real-life events, such as the Battle of Antietam, the Coffeyville Bank Robbery, the Frisco Shootout, the Skeleton Canyon shootout, and the Gunfight at the O.K. Corral.

The Cartel's multiplayer mode features two types of multiplayer; cooperative and competitive. Cooperative gameplay allows up to three players to team up to complete campaign missions. Competitive mode is traditional player v. player with two gametypes available - "Objective Based" and "Team Deathmatch". Both gametypes use a "cop v. criminal" system, where one team is the cops and the other is the criminals. In objective-based gameplay, players set out to either engage in criminal activity or prevent the other team from doing so, with a series of objectives to be completed or prevented.

== Development ==
=== Call of Juarez ===
Call of Juarez originated in 2004 and was intended as a fast-paced arcade-style first-person shooter. However, within the first few months of development, Techland changed the core gameplay; according to producer Paweł Zawodny,

it was perfectly characterized [as] "action driven, with the gameplay based on fast and accurate shooting". Finally, however, we've decided to step away from the simple arcade gameplay, having a really serious deep shooter instead, with a strong focus on the plot. We treat the project with the highest priority and we want the game to be seen as a serious player in the FPP shooter market, despite the Wild West themed action.

The designers were especially keen to make a specifically Western-themed first-person shooter, as they felt the FPS genre had become overly dominated by World War II and science fiction games.

In relation to the game's graphics, Call of Juarez used the third iteration of Techland's in-house game engine, the Chrome Engine. For Chrome Engine 3, Techland had been working with nVidia to incorporate Shader Model 3.0, and this version of the engine allowed for per-pixel lighting and rendering techniques such as normal mapping, Phong shading, Blinn lighting, virtual displacement mapping, shadow mapping, HDR environment mapping, and post-processing effects such as enhanced depth of field, light blooms, refraction and heat distortion. The engine also facilitated wind effects, alterations to object properties when interacting with liquids, Shader Model 3.0-based simulation and animation of vegetation, fumes and smoke, and changes in daytime and the position of global lighting.

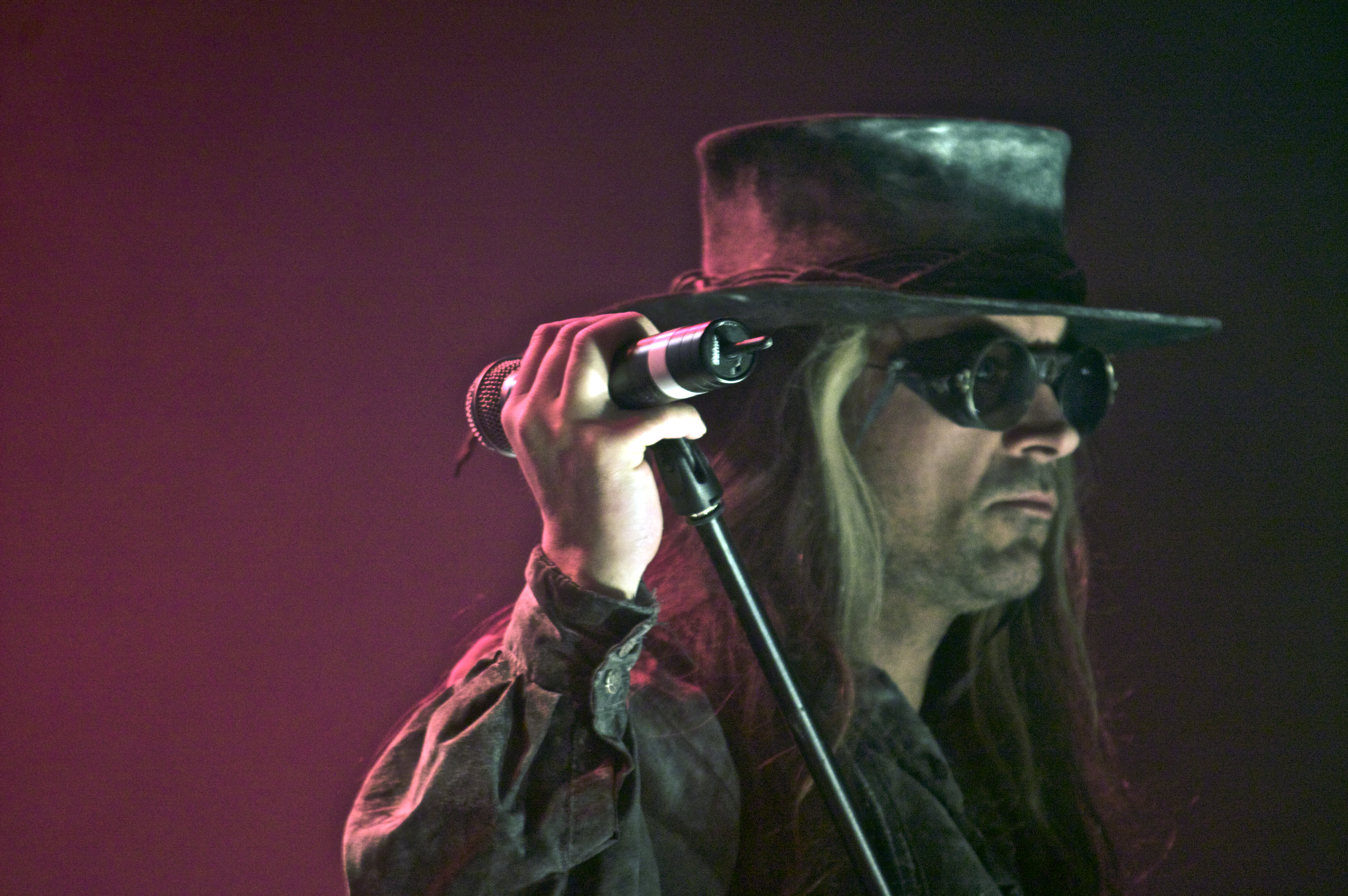
Ray McCall's appearance in the game was partially inspired by Carl McCoy (pictured), lead singer of Fields of the Nephilim.

The game's script was written by Haris Orkin and Paweł Selinger (who also served as the game's lead designer and lead artist). Selinger came up with the basic plot outline and characters, and Orkin wrote the dialogue and story specifics. He and Selinger cite John Ford's The Searchers (1956), Henry Hathaway's Nevada Smith (1966), and Clint Eastwood's Pale Rider (1985) and Unforgiven (1992) as influencing the tone of the game, with the character of Ray partially inspired by Will Munny (Clint Eastwood) in Unforgiven. The character also drew inspiration from the Saint of Killers character from Garth Ennis's Preacher series (1995–2000), and Ennis's Just a Pilgrim (2001). Visually, Ray was based on Carl McCoy, lead singer of Fields of the Nephilim.

The Windows version of the game was released in Europe in September 2006 and Australia in October 2006. The North American version was not released until June 2007, having been delayed so as to be released alongside the Xbox 360 port. Techland used this time to make some changes to the game; unlike the European version, the North American version was optimised for DirectX 10, one of the first PC games to feature such optimisation. Shortly after the North American release, Techland released a DirectX 10 enhancement patch for all versions of the game, adding such elements as geometry shaders, dynamic shadows, high dynamic range lighting, and parallax occlusion mapping.

The Xbox 360 version was released worldwide in June 2007. Comparing this version to the original PC version prior to the DirectX 10 patch, Zawodny said there would be a considerable graphical improvement; "we squeezed as much as possible from the Xbox 360's vertex and pixel shaders. There's high dynamic range lighting, hardware anti-aliasing, bump mapping on almost everything, relief mapping on many objects, and subsurface scattering, just to mention a few technical terms". He also revealed the Xbox version would feature three new single-player missions with their own self-contained story, a duel mode whereby the player can duel with enemies from the campaign, and additional multiplayer modes and maps. Additionally, Techland rebuilt some of Billy's levels (including the game's opening level), cutting back on the stealth elements and incorporating more action-focused chase scenes.

=== Bound in Blood ===
Although the first game did not sell well in North America, its European sales were much better, and a second game, Bound in Blood, was announced in January 2009 for PC, PlayStation 3, and Xbox 360. The developers had taken on board the most common criticisms of the first game (mainly concerning the platforming and stealth sections), whilst enhancing the mechanics of the original that received the most praise, namely Ray's gameplay.

Using Chrome Engine 4, the game would feature considerable graphical improvements over the original, with lead product manager Paweł Kopiński stating, "we've managed to achieve increased performance allowing for even more polygons on screen and advanced special effects. Unlike Chrome Engine 3, Chrome Engine 4 used deferred rendering, which allowed for more advanced lighting and post-processing effects. It was also the first iteration of the engine with "true multi-platform support."

Discussing inspirations for the game, Kopiński stated, "it can't be simply categorized as either a Spaghetti Western or a realistic Western. It's a blend of the best elements from both." According to co-writer Haris Orkin, "it's probably closer now to a Spaghetti Western than a classic John Ford western [...] I guess I would call it a post-modern western along the lines of Unforgiven or The Wild Bunch." Specific influences included Sergio Leone's Dollars Trilogy and Once Upon a Time in the West (1968), James Mangold's 3:10 to Yuma (2007), and Ed Harris's Appaloosa (2008). The team also drew inspiration from real life, with Orkin stating, "many of the actual outlaws of the time were former confederate soldiers; Jesse James and his brothers, the Youngers. Archie Clement. So the McCalls were based somewhat on those actual outlaws."

When dealing with this period of history, Orkin and Techland approached it with serious intentions, striving to be as historically accurate as possible and deal with some of the real issues of the day, irrespective of whether such issues remain controversial today. Orkin states, "we talk about the white suppression of Native Americans, specifically the Apache, and how that fueled their anger [...] we deal with issues like racism, slavery, and the oppression of Native Americans and Mexicans in south Texas. Once you go into those worlds and create a story around them, to skirt those truths or pretend they don't exist does them a disservice."

=== The Cartel ===
Bound in Blood sold considerably better than the original game (over 1 million units) and The Cartel was announced in February 2011. For the first time in the series, the game would be set in the modern day, with Ubisoft's director of marketing, Adam Novickas, stating, "the game will bring the best elements of the Wild West into modern times." This relocation, however, was met with skepticism. After a non-playable demo was shown at PAX in March, IGN's Martin Robinson wrote, "it looks like Call of Juarez has ditched its one point of distinction, exposing an insipid shooter that's lost a fistful of charm in the process." Similarly, GameSpot's Jane Douglas wrote, "as unlikely decisions go, setting a Wild West franchise's third installment in 21st-century Los Angeles and Mexico ranks on par with a disco-era Prince of Persia reboot."

Techland's project coordinator, Błażej Krakowiak, explained the relocation; "we moved the franchise to a modern setting because we felt the Wild West values and experience are universal." When asked by GameSpot what he would say to fans who weren't happy with the change, he said, "you should trust us. This is a great western game." Ubisoft further explained,

during the development of Bound in Blood people kept asking us whether the traditional Western was still relevant in modern times. We kept saying "of course" and we still believe it. It's because Westerns are universal: the Wild West is more than just time and place. Bringing the Call of Juarez franchise into modern times allows us to prove that we mean it.

The game was built using Chrome Engine 5, and according to the developers, several individual levels, such as one set in a packed nightclub, feature more assets than the entirety of Bound in Blood. The engine allowed for advanced screen space ambient occlusion, custom anti-aliasing, and texture filtering, with anisotropic filtering allowing for smoother transitions between mipmap levels. The engine can also handle complex and dynamic light shafts and features advanced A-buffering.

=== Gunslinger ===
After The Cartel flopped both financially and critically, Ubisoft sent an email through UPlay to registered owners of the game, asking them which Call of Juarez game was their favourite and how would they rate The Cartel itself. The email also included a series of gameplay set-pieces, asking players which they'd most like to see in an "as yet unannounced" game.

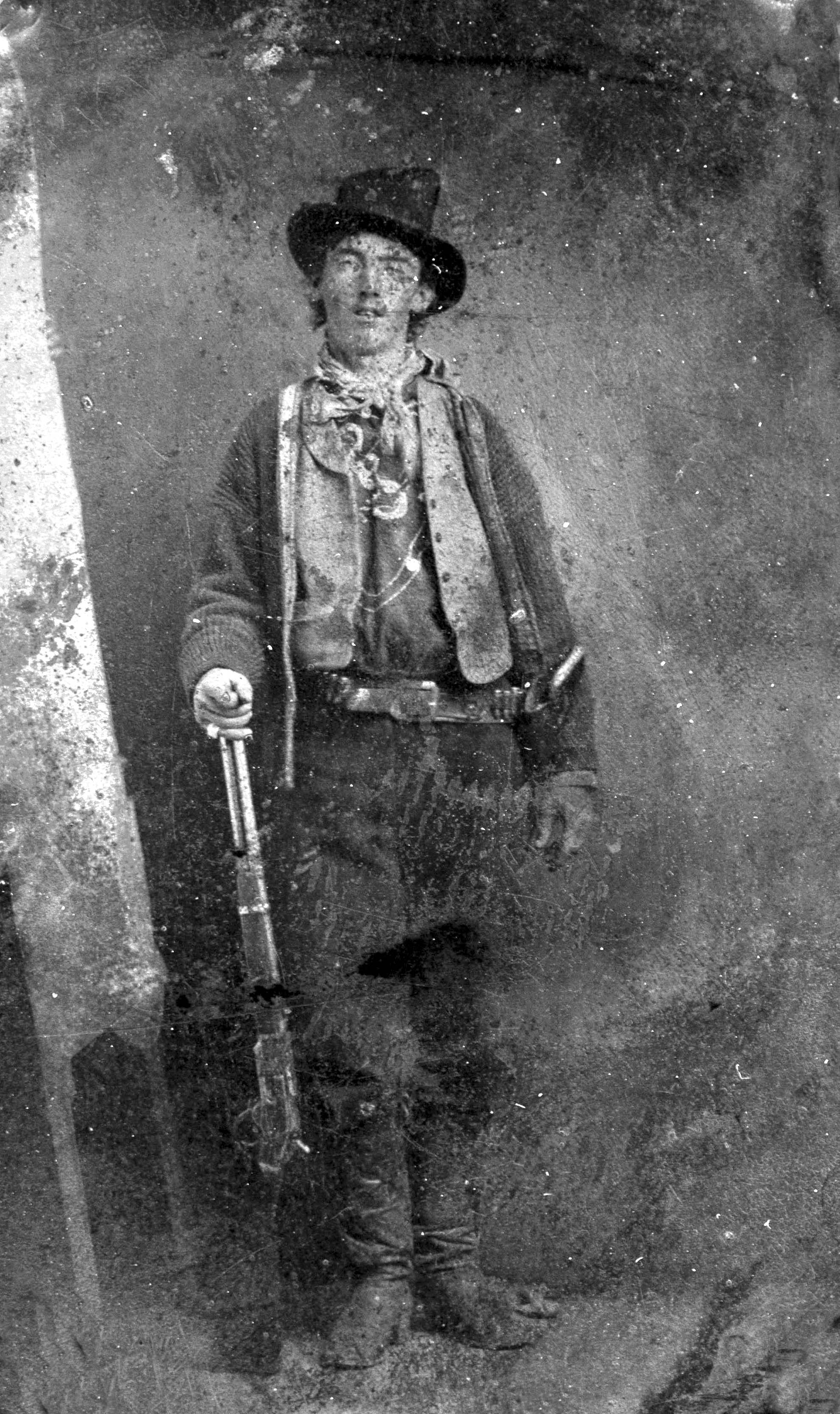
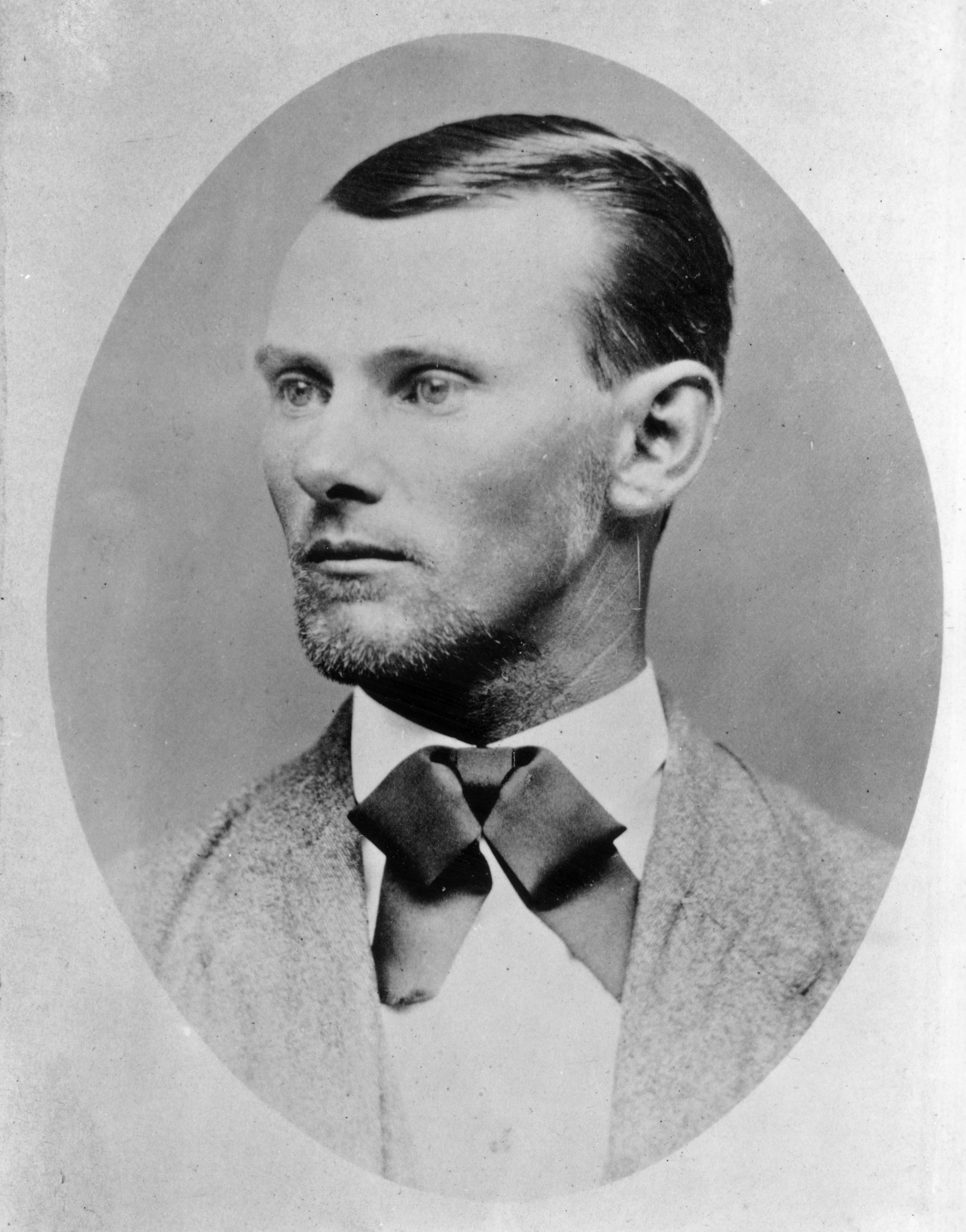
Billy the Kid (left) and Jesse James (right) - two of the legendary Wild West figures who appear in the game

Gunslinger was announced in September 2012, with Ubisoft emphasising that the game would feature legendary Wild West figures such as Billy the Kid, Pat Garrett, Wyatt Earp, Butch Cassidy, and Jesse James, and that for the first time in the series, an experience point-based skill progression system would be utilised. Addressing why the team had returned to the Wild West after setting The Cartel in the modern-day, Krakowiak stated, "we did so for a number of reasons, but basically because of what we've heard from fans and the fact that we're ready to believe that this is where the series belongs." At PAX 2013, Ubisoft brand manager Aymeric Evennou echoed Krakowiak; "this is where the brand belongs. We tried something else, but now we're fully dedicated to please the fans." Indeed, Techland knew another subpar game would kill the franchise, with design expert Xavier Penin, who also contributed to the script, stating, "we were on a mission to save the Call of Juarez brand, literally."

In terms of the game's narrative, which is self-consciously a mixture of fact and fiction, the team tried to narrow down what makes this period of history so specific, and "what we came up was the stories, the legends, the mixture between myth and truth. So we really focused on the storytelling and narration." The outline of the story was conceived by producer Krzysztof Nosek and writer Rafał W. Orkan, who brought it to Haris Orkin, without characters or specific story elements in place. Wanting the actual narration to be as important as the narrative, they told Orkin that the storyline needed to be structured like Bastion, whereby things in the game world would change in front of the players' eyes, based upon what was being said in the narration. Orkin loved the idea, as it paralleled how the legends of the West were formed in the first place - myths and exaggeration overtook fact and reality, and so the question of truth versus embellishment became a major part of the story; "we decided our narrator would be unreliable and that the world would change as the story changed. I thought that perfectly mimicked how the history of the West was written in the first place." Orkin was particularly inspired by John Ford's The Man Who Shot Liberty Valance (1962) and Arthur Penn's Little Big Man (1970), both of which deal with myths overtaking reality in the public consciousness. A quote from Liberty Valance, "when the legend becomes fact, print the legend", became a central idea in Orkin's script.

== Reception ==
Aggregate review scores
Game	Year	Metacritic
Call of Juarez	2006	72/100 (PC); 71/100 (X360)
Call of Juarez: Bound in Blood	2009	78/100 (PC); 78/100 (PS3); 77/100 (X360)
Call of Juarez: The Cartel	2011	51/100 (PC); 45/100 (PS3); 47/100 (X360)
Call of Juarez: Gunslinger	2013	79/100 (PC); 75/100 (PS3); 76/100 (X360); 72/100 (Switch)

The Call of Juarez games have received reviews ranging from very positive to very negative.

The original game received mixed reviews. Most critics praised Ray's levels and the general shooting mechanics but found Billy's levels significantly inferior, especially the platforming sections and the implementation of the whip. Many critics were impressed with how the game recreated an authentic Western tone, and Marc Alaimo's voice acting as Ray was generally lauded. Eurogamer's Kieron Gillen called the PC version "as good a cowboy shooter as I've played", whilst Tom Bramwell felt the Xbox 360 version "has given new life to an area of the FPS genre where tons of developers have given up". PALGN's Mark Morrow called the PC version a "remarkably enjoyable game." GameSpot's Alex Navarro called it "a well-made genre exercise." IGN's Dan Adams was more critical, arguing that "solid basic shooting mechanics aren't enough to make a passable game good." Official Xbox Magazine's Cameron Lewis felt that "there's nothing to distinguish it from the rest of the shooter crowd."

Bound in Blood received generally favorable reviews. Most critics found it substantially better than the original, with many praising the plot, the shooting mechanics, and the voice acting. Criticism tended to focus on poor enemy AI, repetitive level design, and, the lack of any kind of co-op. CVG's Richard Cobbett called it "an outstanding FPS." GameSpot's Randolph Ramsay found it to be "tense, riveting, and superb-looking" and "an almost cinematic experience." PALGN's Michael Kontoudis called it "the best videogame Western ever made." On the other hand, Eurogamer's Oli Walsh argued, "it's far too unvaried a shooting gallery to earn an unhesitating recommendation." Official Xbox Magazine's Taylor Cocke called it "fairly well-done but somewhat basic." GameSpy's Eric Neigher argued that "there's nothing's particularly outstanding or original here."

The Cartel received negative reviews. Common criticisms included poorly implanted mechanics, a cliched storyline, underdeveloped characters, inconsistent audio, error-filled subtitles, tone-deaf racial and gender stereotypes, and poor graphics. In particular, the game's glitches and lack of technical polish received a lot of negative attention. Game Informer's Dan Ryckert called it "generic at best, broken at worst." IGN's Anthony Gallegos argued, "it's not the worst shooter I've played, but it's got all the problems of a budget title and few redeeming qualities." Official Xbox Magazine's Andrew Hayward found it demonstrated "a lack of care and an inattention to detail." PC Gamer's Tom Senior called it "a steaming turd", "bland, repetitive, and dull," and "brainless, generic and devoid of personality." Destructoid's James Stephanie Sterling wrote that the game is "a sloppy serving from people who should know better, and ought to be ashamed of themselves."

Gunslinger received positive reviews. Critics praised the storytelling, the fast-paced arcade-style shooting, and the voice acting. Criticisms focused on a predictable denouement and shallow boss battles. Destructoid's James Stephanie Sterling called it "the best Call of Juarez game, [and] a damn fine and worthy shooter in its own right." GameSpot's Mark Watson called it a "remarkable shooter", "a breath of fresh air," and "tight and controlled." IGN's Colin Moriarty argued that "it has a lot of charm." GamesRadar+'s Lorenzo Veloria felt that for "those who want a solid Western shooter with exhilarating mechanics, you'll want to give this game a try."

=== Sales ===
The original game did not sell well in North America, moving only 137,000 units across both PC and Xbox 360. Its European sales were considerably better, with Techland crediting the game as putting them on the map as a globally recognised developer. Bound in Blood was a commercial success. In its first four days of North American release, it sold 24,000 units on the Xbox 360 and 20,000 units on the PlayStation 3. In the United Kingdom, it entered the charts at #6, rising the following month to #4. By the end of September, the game had sold 900,000 units across all systems, making it one of Ubisoft's best selling titles for the first half of the fiscal year. Gunslinger was the third best-selling PSN title in May 2013, coming behind Far Cry 3: Blood Dragon and Terraria. In July, Ubisoft released its first quarterly financial report, in which they revealed that digital downloads were up 27% from the same time period the previous year. They cited the strong sales of Blood Dragon and Gunslinger.
