= Call of Juarez (video game) =

2006 first-person shooter video game

- North American PC cover art
- Developer: Techland
- Publishers: Microsoft Windows: EU: Focus Home Interactive; AU: Auran Development; NA: Ubisoft; Xbox 360: WW: Ubisoft
- Producer: Paweł Zawodny
- Designers: Paweł Selinger; Paweł Marchewka
- Programmer: Wojciech Pszczółkowski
- Artist: Paweł Selinger
- Writers: Paweł Selinger; Haris Orkin
- Composer: Paweł Błaszczak
- Series: Call of Juarez
- Engine: Chrome Engine 3
- Platforms: Windows; Xbox 360
- Release: Microsoft Windows: EU: September 15, 2006; AU: October 30, 2006; NA: June 5, 2007; Xbox 360: NA: June 13, 2007; AU: June 28, 2007; EU: June 29, 2007
- Genre: First-person shooter
- Modes: Single-player, multiplayer

Call of Juarez is a 2006 Western-themed first-person shooter for Windows and Xbox 360. Developed by Techland, the Windows version was published in Europe by Focus Home Interactive in September 2006, in Australia by Auran Development in October 2006, and in North America by Ubisoft in June 2007. The Xbox 360 version was ported by Techland and published worldwide by Ubisoft in June 2007. In March 2011, it was made available on Xbox Live, and in November 2018, it was released on GOG.com. It is the first game in the Call of Juarez series, which would go on to include three additional titles; Call of Juarez: Bound in Blood (a prequel to the first game), Call of Juarez: The Cartel (set in the modern-day), and Call of Juarez: Gunslinger (returns the series to the Western setting).

The game tells the story of Billy 'Candle', a young ranch hand and fortune-seeker, and Ray McCall, a former gunslinger turned preacher. After two years in Juarez unsuccessfully looking for the mysterious "Gold of Juarez", Billy returns to his hometown of Hope, Texas, near the Mexican border. However, when he arrives at his farm, he finds his mother and stepfather have been murdered, and "Call of Juarez" written on a barn in their blood. Mistakenly believing that Billy is the killer, Ray (his step-uncle) abandons his role as the town's preacher and sets out to avenge their deaths by killing Billy, as Billy himself tries to find out who actually committed the murders, and why.

Originally called Lawman, Call of Juarez was initially conceived as a reaction to World War II and science fiction games dominating the first-person shooter genre. The designers drew inspiration from a range of Western-themed films, TV shows, and literature, as well as some real-life stories and figures. The game was built using Techland's in-house game engine, the Chrome Engine. For the subsequent Xbox 360 release, numerous graphical improvements were made, and some gameplay elements were changed, reducing the amount of stealth in Billy's levels. The North American PC release version incorporated many of these graphical and gameplay changes and was one of the first PC games optimized for Windows Vista and DirectX 10. Techland also released a patch allowing for those who owned the original DirectX9 version of the game to upgrade to the DirectX10 version.

Call of Juarez received mixed reviews, with most critics praising Ray's levels and the general shooting mechanics, but finding Billy's levels significantly inferior, especially the platforming sections and the implementation of the whip. The enemy AI was also criticised. On the other hand, many critics were impressed with how the game recreated an authentic Western tone, and Marc Alaimo's voice acting as Ray was generally lauded. Although the game did not sell very well in North America, it fared better in Europe, with Techland citing it as "putting us on the map."

== Gameplay ==
Call of Juarez is a first-person shooter in which the player controls alternating protagonists - Billy 'Candle' and Ray McCall, each of whom has a different style of gameplay. Billy's levels are partially stealth-based, whereas Ray's are more traditional shoot 'em ups.

Although the style of play for each character is different, controlling them is broadly similar. Each shares an identical HUD, with the same information available to the player. Both can single-wield or dual wield handguns and single-wield other weapons, such as rifles. Both can also interact with certain objects, such as health pick-ups (in the Xbox 360 version, health automatically regenerates over time), ammo, and weaponry. Both characters can also throw dynamite and can start fires by throwing or shooting oil lamps. Both are capable of hand-to-hand combat, although Ray can pick up items such as chairs, and either throw them at enemies or use them as melee weapons. Both can also ride horses, from which they can shoot and enter gallop mode. Gallop mode can only be maintained for a certain amount of time before the horse becomes fatigued.

The main difference between the two characters is that Ray is stronger and slower, and although he cannot jump as high as Billy, he can kick heavy obstacles out of his way and take considerably more damage from enemy fire, due to wearing a cuirass. Billy can move faster than Ray and is quieter, allowing him to sneak up on enemies. He can also grip onto ledges and pull himself up. Billy can also use two weapons that Ray cannot - a bow and a whip. When Billy uses the bow, the game automatically goes into slow motion for a set period. This is the only weapon in the game that allows for silent kills. The whip is very weak as a weapon, and is mainly used to aid Billy in climbing or jumping over large gaps, by lassoing nearby trees. Unique to Ray is his ability to rapid-fire a single six-shooter (fanning) and his ability to wield a Bible. If the player presses the shoot button for the hand holding the Bible, Ray will quote a random bible passage. This will occasionally cause enemies to panic and drop their weapons, freeze, or run away entirely.

Screenshot of "concentration mode" in the PC version of Call of Juarez; when this mode is activated, the game automatically goes into slow motion, and two targeting reticulates appear on the edges of the screen, automatically moving in towards the centre.

Another important difference is that when controlling Ray, the player has access to "concentration mode". During combat, when he draws either handgun, concentration mode is automatically activated, and the game goes into slow motion, with two targeting reticles appearing on either side of the screen, each moving towards the centre. The player cannot control the movement of either reticle, nor can they move the character during concentration mode, but they can control the positioning of the screen, allowing them to manoeuvre Ray's stance to shoot when the reticles pass over an enemy. Players can also shoot independently from either their left or right gun, or both simultaneously. Ray's levels also involve numerous duels between himself and one or more enemies. In these shootouts, the player must wait for a countdown, at which point the enemy will reach for their weapon. Only then can Ray draw his own gun and fire. To draw Ray's gun, the player must move the mouse/analog stick downwards and then snap it upwards, at which point a reticule appears on screen which can be controlled as normal. Character movement during duels is limited to leaning left and right.

Unlike Ray's levels, Billy's feature an element of stealth gameplay. Billy can move silently whilst in sneak mode and can hide in bushes and shadows. When he does so, he is hidden from enemy sight, and his character icon on the HUD is blacked out to show he cannot be seen. Often, even if he is seen, if he can hide quickly enough, he will escape permanent detection.

=== Multiplayer ===
The game's multiplayer mode is available via LAN and online on Microsoft Windows, and via System Link and Xbox Live on Xbox 360. Both the Windows and the Xbox 360 versions feature "Deathmatch", "Skirmish" (team deathmatch), "Robbery" (the team designated as "Outlaws" must find the hidden gold and return it to an "escape zone" without being caught by the team designated as "Lawmen"), and "Gold Rush" (gold is spread over the map; at the end of a specified time, the player who has collected the most gold wins).

The Xbox 360 version also features "Capture the Bag" (each team has a bag of gold. To win, one team must capture the other team's bag and return it to their own base), "Wanted" (one player is randomly designated as the "wanted" player, and other players can only score points by killing this particular player. Once the wanted player is killed, the player who killed them then becomes the wanted player. The player with the most points at the end of the game wins), and "Famous Events" (game scenarios based on real-life events, such as the Gunfight at the O.K. Corral, the Wilcox Train Robbery, the Coffeyville Bank Robbery, and scenarios based on robberies committed by Jesse James and Butch Cassidy's Wild Bunch).

Both the Windows and the Xbox 360 versions of the game feature four multiplayer classes - "Rifleman" (wields two revolvers and a rifle), "Gunslinger" (wields two revolvers and several sticks of dynamite), "Miner" (wields a revolver, a shotgun, and a full complement of dynamite), and "Sniper" (wields a revolver and a sniper rifle).

== Plot ==
The Lost Gold of Juarez was supposedly the ransom for Moctezuma II, held hostage by conquistadors in Tenochtitlan, but it disappeared after the city fell, with some believing it was buried near the town of Juarez. The legend says that Huītzilōpōchtli placed a curse on the gold, causing all who seek it to descend into madness. This madness is known as the Call of Juarez.

Texas, 1884. Seventeen-year-old Billy 'Candle' returns home after two unsuccessful years of searching for the gold. Although excited to see his mother, Marisa, he has no desire to see his stepfather Thomas, who used to beat him daily. Billy doesn't know who his real father is, he got his nickname from a medallion with a candle engraved on it, given to him by Marisa. Meanwhile, Reverend Ray McCall is giving a sermon in town. Rumored to have once been a gunslinger, Ray is Thomas's older brother and now the local preacher. Alerted to gunshots at Thomas's farm, Ray arrives to find Thomas and Marisa dead, the words "Call of Juarez" written on the wall in their blood, and Billy standing over the bodies. Billy panics and flees, with Ray assuming he is the killer. Believing that God has assigned him the task, Ray sets out to track Billy down.

Billy stows away on a train heading to San Jose, home of Molly Ferguson, a young woman with whom he had a relationship a year prior. With Ray in close pursuit, Billy reaches the Ferguson ranch and sneaks inside to talk to Molly. Meanwhile, Ray encounters a group of Texas Rangers with a warrant for Billy's arrest. Ray aids them as they storm the ranch, chasing Billy and shooting him, whereupon he falls from a cliff into a river. Ray returns to the ranch and finds out the rangers are actually hired guns, and they have killed everyone except Molly, whom they have taken captive. Thinking Billy is dead, Ray questions whether he may have been wrong about the murders, and vows to redeem himself by saving Molly.

Meanwhile, Billy survives his fall but loses his medallion. He is nursed back to health by an Apache Native American named Calm Water, who advises him to accept who he is and embrace his destiny. However, the hired guns arrive, killing Calm Water and taking Billy captive. Meanwhile, Ray learns they are heading to Juarez, prompting him to muse "so, the events have come full circle."

In a cell in Juarez, Billy meets Juan 'Juarez' Mendoza, for whom the hired guns work. He reveals he is Billy's father, explaining that about seventeen years prior, the pregnant Marisa stole the medallion and left him for Thomas. As the medallion is the key to locating the gold, Mendoza has been searching for it ever since. Billy says he lost the medallion in the river, but Mendoza doesn't believe him and sends him out into the desert, threatening to kill Molly if Billy fails to find the gold within an hour. Using his memory of the shape of the medallion and a story Marisa told him as a child, Billy locates the gold, but Mendoza follows and attempts to kill him. Billy flees and is rescued by Ray, who tells him to get to safety as he saves Molly. Ray then reveals his backstory. He and Thomas both fell in love with Marisa shortly after meeting her, even though she was Mendoza's woman. She chose Thomas over Ray, fleeing to the caverns in which the gold was hidden, but Ray tracked them down. Their younger brother, William, a priest, attempted to intervene, but Ray killed him in a panic over the assumption that he was reaching for a gun, but it was a Bible. On that day, he renounced violence and embraced God. Accepting that the gold is cursed, he, Marisa, and Thomas left it behind and sealed the cavern.

Ray storms the alcazar and fights his way to Molly, but Mendoza traps them inside and sets fire to the cell. Billy returns, puts out the fire, and shoots Mendoza. However, as Ray leaves the cell, Mendoza appears and fatally shoots him, revealing he had been wearing armor. He taunts Billy by saying that all of the men he sent to Hope raped Marisa, and when Billy is dead, Mendoza will do the same to Molly. Mendoza attempts to shoot Billy but realizes he is out of ammo. The two then fight with their fists, with Billy winning. As Ray lies dying, he prays that his actions will not lead to the deaths of Billy and Molly, and he recovers his strength just as Mendoza is about to stab Billy in the back. As his last act, Ray kills Mendoza before thanking God for the opportunity to redeem himself, reciting the words "though I walk through the valley of the shadow of death, I will fear no evil".

In the end, Billy and Molly bury Ray in a nearby cemetery. There, Billy is determined to take Calm Water's advice: to stop running from his destiny and his true self.

=== Bonus missions ===
The story follows an unnamed Texas deputy as he tracks down a murderous gang of rustlers and assumes his role as interim sheriff in the small town of Round Rock, Texas. Following the gang to a farmhouse, he sees them set the house on fire but is able to douse the flames, rescuing the woman and child locked inside. He catches up to the gang on the edge of a forest and a firefight ensues, with the deputy able to kill several of them before the others flee. Three days later, he tracks them to an abandoned settlement. He is immediately attacked but is able to eliminate them one by one until only the leader survives. Impressed with the deputy's skills, he suggests they team up, but the deputy refuses. In the subsequent duel, the leader is killed.

The deputy then heads to Round Rock to serve as the interim sheriff. Upon arriving, he finds a letter from the mayor telling him that Vasquez, the notoriously violent leader of a gang of thieves and rustlers, is staying in town with his men. Shortly thereafter, Vasquez's men start shooting up the saloon. In a shootout, the deputy kills all of them, except Vasquez, who he arrests. With Vasquez in custody, County Commissioner Grizzwald sends a four-man team to escort him to El Paso to stand trial. No sooner have they left town, however, when they are attacked by bandits. With the deputy's help, they make it back to town, and the deputy concludes that someone must have tipped the bandits off. Vasquez tells the deputy that the bandits work for Grizzwald and that Grizzwald has been taking a cut from Vasquez's earnings for the last five years. Now Grizzwald wants Vasquez out of the picture. An attack is launched against the town, and Vasquez is killed. The deputy manages to kill the bandits, and Grizzwald acknowledges how impressed he is. In a duel, the deputy kills Grizzwald. However, nobody else heard Vasquez tell the deputy that Grizzwald was corrupt, and with no evidence to back up the claim, the deputy realises he will be charged with murder. Instead of heading back to El Paso, he heads to Mexico, where he goes on the run.

== Development ==
=== Origins ===
Call of Juarez was announced by Techland at E3 in May 2004, under the name Lawman. In March 2005, they revealed the game's name had been changed to Call of Juarez, and with that change, the style of gameplay had also shifted. According to producer Paweł Zawodny,

at first, the game was supposed to be a fast-paced shooter, with a distinct arcade feel. It was perfectly characterized [as] "action driven, with the gameplay based on fast and accurate shooting". Finally, however, we've decided to step away from the simple arcade gameplay, having a really serious deep shooter instead, with a strong focus on the plot. We treat the project with the highest priority and we want the game to be seen as a serious player in the FPP shooter market, despite the Wild West themed action.

Techland were especially keen to make a specifically Western-themed first-person shooter, as they felt the FPS genre had become overly dominated by World War II and science fiction games. They revealed that a major part of the gameplay would involve duelling, with players needing quick reflexes to win, just like the real-life gunslingers of the time. The designers had also carried out extensive research for the game - for example, the guns act the way the real guns of the period did, and the clothes, flora, fauna, and architecture are accurate to the locations during the period in which the game is set. They also worked with horse riding experts to ensure the scenes involving horses were as realistic as possible. Zawodny believed the game would provide players with "a new level of emergent gameplay."

=== Technology ===
Screenshot of combat in the Xbox 360 version of Call of Juarez, showing the use of depth of field; when the player goes into focus mode, much of what is on-screen becomes blurred, with only the content in the player's immediate line of fire remaining sharpened, such as the enemy or the rocks in this case.

Speaking of the game's physics engine, Zawodny explained,

we are going to simulate not only rigid bodies and ragdoll physics, but also other physical phenomena, such as the behaviour of liquids and gases (including flammable ones). This leads to new types of outstanding gameplay, such as the possibility to control the spreading of fire once you know the direction of wind, or even scaring enemies out of their hideaways with well-directed smoke.

In relation to the game's graphics, Call of Juarez was using a new version of Techland's in-house game engine, the Chrome Engine. Since its introduction in 2003, Chrome had undergone several upgrades and for this new version (Chrome Engine 3), Techland had been working with nVidia to incorporate Shader Model 3.0. This version of the engine also allows for per-pixel lighting and rendering techniques such as normal mapping, Phong shading, Blinn lighting, virtual displacement mapping, shadow mapping, HDR environment mapping, and post-processing effects such as enhanced depth-of-field, light blooms, refraction and heat distortion. The engine also facilitated wind effects, alterations to object properties when interacting with liquids, Shader Model 3.0-based simulation and animation of vegetation, fumes, and smoke, and changes in daytime and the position of global lighting.

The game also included ChromeEd; an "effective and easy to use authoring tool for creating not only user's own maps but even completely new mods. Full user tools will be available for creation of almost every aspect of the game and left up to the users' imagination."

=== Influences ===
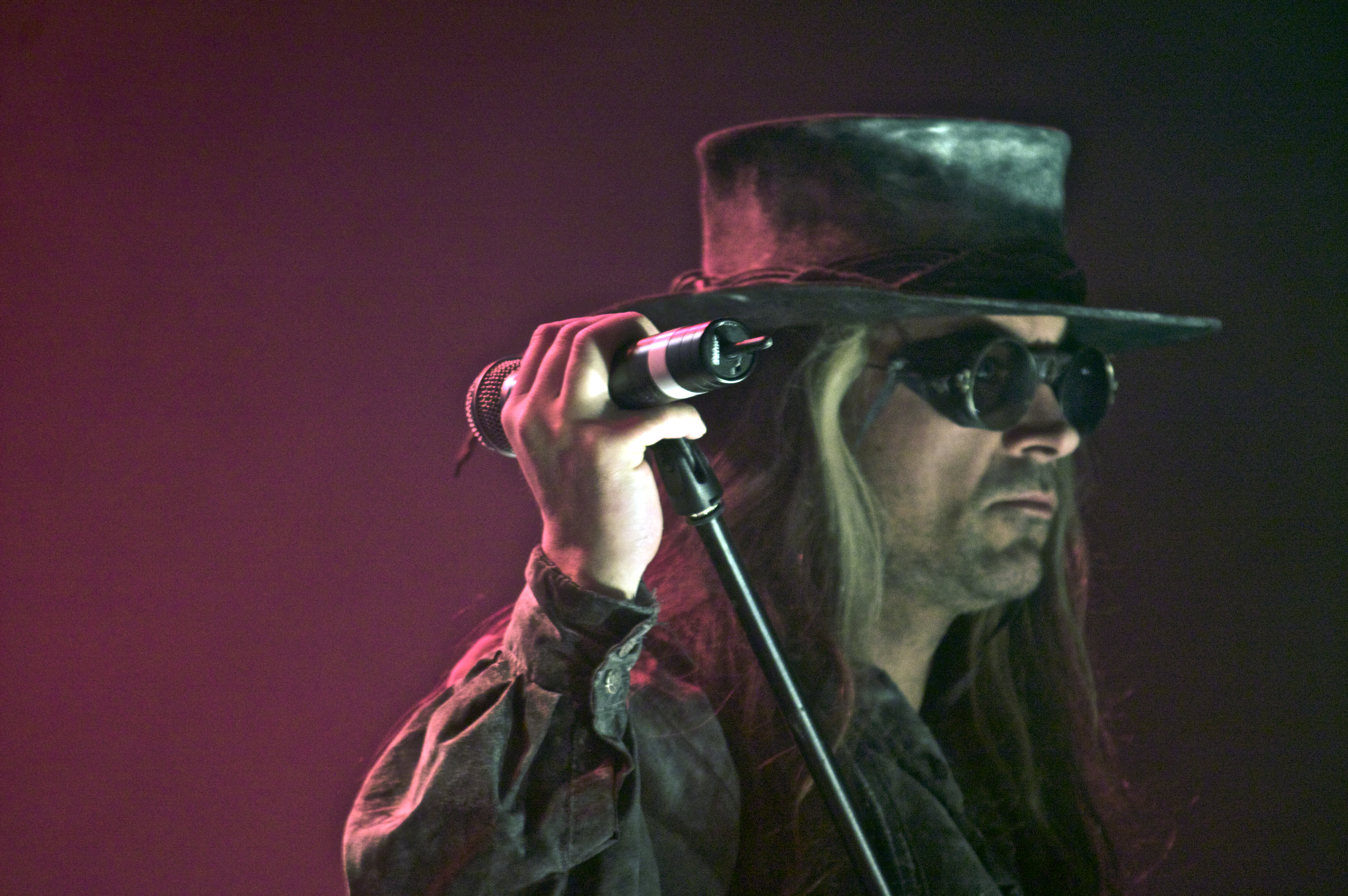
Ray McCall's appearance in the game was partially inspired by Carl McCoy (pictured), lead singer of Fields of the Nephilim.

The game's script was written by Haris Orkin and Paweł Selinger (who also served as the game's lead designer and lead artist). Selinger came up with the basic plot outline and characters, and Orkin wrote the dialogue and story specifics, staying in contact with Techland from Los Angeles. He and Selinger cite John Ford's The Searchers (1956), Henry Hathaway's Nevada Smith (1966), and Clint Eastwood's Pale Rider (1985) and Unforgiven (1992) as influencing the tone of the game, with the character of Ray partially inspired by Will Munny (Clint Eastwood) in Unforgiven. The character also drew inspiration from the Saint of Killers character from Garth Ennis's Preacher series (1995-2000), and Ennis's Just a Pilgrim (2001). Visually, Ray was based on Carl McCoy, lead singer of Fields of the Nephilim.

For the design of the Mexican characters, Selinger cites Sergio Leone's Dollars Trilogy. He also states, "nearly every character in the game is based on some Western character, we even used Dr. Quinn for inspiration."

=== Release ===
In April 2006, Ubisoft signed the publishing rights for the game's North American release. The game was published in Europe by Focus Home Interactive, and in Australia by Auran Development. Shortly after its release in Australia, Auran held two large multiplayer tournaments - one at the Games 1 Expo, the other at the eGames and Entertainment Expo.

The Microsoft Windows version of the game was released in Europe in September 2006 and Australia in October 2006. The North American version was not released until June 2007, having been delayed so as to be released alongside the Xbox 360 port. Techland used this time to make some changes to the game; unlike the European version, which only supported DirectX 9.0c and was intended to run on Windows 2000 or Windows XP, the North American version was optimized for Windows Vista and DirectX 10, one of the first PC games optimized for the new operating system. Shortly after the North American release, Techland released a DirectX 10 enhancement patch for all versions of the game, adding such elements as geometry shaders, dynamic shadows, high dynamic range lighting, and parallax occlusion mapping. The patch also featured the gameplay redesigns introduced for the Xbox 360 version. The DirectX 10 version was also released on Steam, and in 2018 was made available on GOG.com.

=== Xbox 360 version ===
Released worldwide in June 2007, the Xbox 360 version of Call of Juarez was ported by Techland themselves and published by Ubisoft. Originally intended as a cross-platform title for the PC and the original Xbox, during development, Techland elected to port the game to the newly released Xbox 360 instead. Zawodny explained that,

when the Xbox 360 was released, we all quickly learned that it was not only a platform to compete with the PC in terms of technology (performance and graphics) but one with even more graphical potential. Recent first-person shooters released for the Xbox 360 also proved that gameplay on the gamepad can be as smooth and rewarding as with a PC mouse. All things considered, the two platforms that made the most sense for an FPS set in the Wild West were the Xbox 360 and PC. Call of Juarez, with its "full akimbo" mode, also seemed ideal for consoles because of the two triggers that give you a true idea of what it's like wielding dual six-shooters.

Comparing the Xbox version to the original PC version prior to the DirectX 10 patch, Zawodny said there would be a considerable graphical improvement; "we squeezed as much as possible from the Xbox 360's vertex and pixel shaders. There's high dynamic range lighting, hardware anti-aliasing, bump mapping on almost everything, relief mapping on many objects, and subsurface scattering, just to mention a few technical terms". He also revealed the Xbox version would utilize both Xbox Live and System Link for multiplayer mode and Gamerscore achievements for both single and multiplayer modes. It would also feature three new single-player missions with their own self-contained story ("Farm", "Ghost Town", and "Showdown At Round Rock"), a duel mode whereby the player can duel with enemies from the campaign, and additional multiplayer modes and maps.

Additionally, Techland rebuilt some of Billy's levels (including the game's opening level), cutting back on the stealth elements and incorporating more action-focused chase scenes. Speaking of the changes from the PC version, Techland's lead product manager, Paweł Kopiński, states,

for the X360 version, we implemented new motion capture animation (most of the cutscenes have been re-recorded using motion capture), and the appearance of the game has been changed dramatically. It is now even better looking and has even better atmosphere. All levels have once again been assessed step-by-step in terms of their playability, attractiveness and understandability. At nearly every step we made bigger or smaller changes that improved the reception of every level. Some of them were almost remade from scratch. The rebuilt beginning of the game dramatically changes the first impression.

The game was made available on Xbox Live in March 2011.

== Reception ==
Reception

Aggregate score
Aggregator	Score	
Aggregator	PC	Xbox 360
Metacritic	72/100	71/100

Review scores
Publication	Score	
Publication	PC	Xbox 360
Eurogamer	8/10	8/10
GameSpot	7/10	7.4/10
GameSpy	2.5/5	2.5/5
IGN	6.8/10	7.5/10 (NA); 8.1/10 (AU)
Official Xbox Magazine (US)		6/10
PALGN	7.5/10	7/10
PC Zone	70/100	

Call of Juarez received "mixed or average reviews" on both systems; the PC version holds an aggregate score of 72 out of 100 on Metacritic, based on twenty-five reviews, and the Xbox 360 version holds a score of 71 out of 100, based on thirty-seven reviews.

Eurogamer's Kieron Gillen scored the PC version 8 out 10, praising the alternating level structure, and calling the game "as good a cowboy shooter as I've played". He concluded, "of all the cowboy games in the last few years, Call of Juarez is the one which most feels like it has a soul [...] It's a game which you feel someone actually cared about making". Tom Bramwell also scored the Xbox 360 version 8 out of 10, praising the multiplayer modes and the graphical improvements over the PC version. Although he was critical of the use of Billy's whip, which he found to be "needlessly fiddly", he wrote that the game "has given new life to an area of the FPS genre where tons of developers have given up".

PALGN's Mark Morrow scored the PC version 7.5 out of 10. He found Ray's levels "an absolute blast," but Billy's "an absolute bore." Although he praised the tone and voice acting, he was critical of the controls and the overly linear levels, concluding, "the basic first-person shooter concepts are in place, but the essentials aren't." However, he also found it to be a "remarkably enjoyable game." Luke Van Leuveren scored the Xbox 360 version 7 out of 10. He called Billy's levels "tedious" and was also critical of the first-person platforming sections and the use of the whip. Ray's missions, on the other hand, he found to be "brilliant fun". He also praised the writing, and concluded, "Ray's levels are solid enough to recommend Call of Juarez."

GameSpot's Alex Navarro scored the PC version 7 out of 10 and the Xbox 360 version 7.4 out of 10, calling the game "a well-made genre exercise." Whilst he praised Ray's levels, he was critical of Billy's (especially the implementation of the whip and the platforming sections). Ultimately though, he concluded, "it does enough right to transcend its various issues and turn in a pleasing shooter." PC Zone's Jon Blyth scored the game 70/100. He praised the voice acting, tone, and alternating level structure, writing, "there's talent in the storytelling." However, he found concentration mode made the game too easy. He was also critical of the enemy AI, but wrote of the game, "it has numerous problems, but there's something beneath all its faults that I can forgive."

IGN's Dan Adams scored the PC version 6.8 out of 10. He praised the voice acting and Ray's levels but was critical of Billy's, especially the implementation of the whip and the platforming sections (which he called "horrific"). He also felt that concentration mode was "hugely overused." He concluded, "solid basic shooting mechanics aren't enough to make a passable game good." Jonathan Miller scored the Xbox 360 version 7.5 out of 10. He too preferred Ray's levels, and graphically, he found the game to be "solid", citing lighting and shadows as "especially well done". However, he also noted instances of aliasing, vertical tearing, and pop-in. He also praised the atmosphere, soundtrack, voice acting, and variety of gameplay styles, calling it "one of the most fun Westerns to date". In his Australian review of the Xbox 360 version, Bennett Ring scored it 8.1 out of ten, praising the improvements made for the port. Although he found some of Billy's levels "unnecessarily frustrating", he ultimately felt it is "a game that isn't afraid to take chances."

Official Xbox Magazine's Cameron Lewis scored the game 6 out 10, writing, "the game unwraps some interesting ideas, but not one fulfills its promise." He was critical of the use of the whip, the platforming sections, and the enemy AI. Although he liked Ray's levels, he concluded, "in practice, there's nothing to distinguish it from the rest of the shooter crowd on 360." GameSpy's Thierry Nguyen scored the PC version 2.5 out of 5, calling it "well-meaning but ultimately flawed". He disliked Billy's levels, especially the platforming sections and the use of the whip. In Ray's levels, he found concentration mode made the game too easy. He concluded, "the really sloppy platforming and box-moving, which take up a good chunk of the game, puts a big damper on any joy that we might find in shooting up bandits and cowboys". Sterling McGarvey also scored the Xbox 360 version 2.5 out of 5, suggesting it failed to capture "the ambience and authenticity of the historical period." He praised the shooting mechanics but was critical of the whip, writing that the game "feels [like] a next-gen version of the lackluster Dead Man's Hand."

=== Sales ===
The game did not sell well in North America, moving only 137,000 units across both PC and Xbox 360. Its European sales were considerably better, with Techland crediting the game as putting them on the map as a globally recognised developer. Overall, the game sold well enough that Techland and Ubisoft established the Call of Juarez franchise.
