= Call of Juarez: The Cartel =

2011 first-person shooter video game

- European cover art
- Developer: Techland
- Publishers: Ubisoft (2011–2018); Techland (2018–)
- Producer: Paweł Zawodny
- Designer: Paweł Marchewka
- Programmers: Grzegorz Świstowski; Krzysztof Nosek; Marcin Żygadło
- Artist: Paweł Selinger
- Writers: Paweł Selinger; Haris Orkin
- Composer: Paweł Błaszczak
- Series: Call of Juarez
- Engine: Chrome Engine 5
- Platforms: PlayStation 3; Windows; Xbox 360
- Release: PlayStation 3, Xbox 360: NA: July 19, 2011; AU: July 21, 2011; EU: July 22, 2011; Microsoft Windows: AU: September 8, 2011; NA: September 13, 2011; EU: September 16, 2011
- Genre: First-person shooter
- Modes: Single-player, multiplayer

Call of Juarez: The Cartel is a 2011 first-person shooter for PlayStation 3, Windows, and Xbox 360. Developed by Techland and originally published by Ubisoft, the PlayStation and Xbox versions were released in June 2011 and the Windows version in September. It is the third game in the Call of Juarez series, although narratively, it is unrelated to the two previous games (Call of Juarez and Call of Juarez: Bound in Blood). Unlike previous entries, which were set in the Old West, The Cartel is set in modern-day Los Angeles and Mexico. The series would go on to include one additional game; Call of Juarez: Gunslinger (also narratively unrelated to the other games, but which returns to the western setting).

The Cartel tells the story of an interagency task force investigating a powerful Mexican drug cartel after it bombed the DEA's Los Angeles offices. Featuring LAPD detective Ben McCall, FBI agent Kim Evans, and DEA agent Eddie Guerra, the team must face their mistrust of one another, as each is revealed to have their own agenda. When it emerges that the cartel has infiltrated the American government, the case morphs from a drug-related investigation into a political conspiracy, with no one sure where they stand.

The game met with controversy from the moment of its announcement. The decision to relocate from the Wild West to the modern-day was criticised by both fans and game journalists, although Ubisoft and Techland promised the game was still a Western in essence. Community leaders in El Paso and Juarez criticised the use of real-life violence and tragedy as material for violent entertainment. State legislators in Chihuahua went so far as to ask the federal government to ban the game entirely. When it was released, the game was also accused of racism and misogyny. In March 2018, as the rights to the title transitioned from publisher Ubisoft to developer Techland, The Cartel and Gunslinger were delisted from Steam, the PlayStation Store, and Xbox Live. Although Gunslinger returned in April, The Cartel remains unavailable on Steam or the PlayStation Store.

The Cartel received mainly negative reviews. Although some critics thought co-op mode featured some interesting ideas, the majority disliked the game. Common criticisms included poorly implanted game mechanics, a cliched storyline, underdeveloped characters, inconsistent audio quality, error-filled subtitles, tone-deaf racial and gender stereotypes, and poor graphics and animations. In particular, the game's glitches and lack of technical polish received a lot of negative attention, with many opining that it felt rushed, and at least one critic suggesting it was the worst game of 2011. In 2015, the game's lead designer admitted that The Cartel wasn't ready when it was released, calling the game "a mistake".

== Gameplay ==
Call of Juarez: The Cartel is a first-person shooter in which the player controls one of three protagonists: Det. Ben McCall (LAPD), Agent Kim Evans (FBI), or Agent Eddie Guerra (DEA). The two characters whom the player does not choose are controlled either by the AI, or by human player(s) in drop-in/drop-out co-op mode. Unlike the original Call of Juarez, which used alternating characters level-by-level, or Bound in Blood, which allowed players to choose which character to play as for each level, in The Cartel, players pick a character before beginning the first level and are confined to using that character throughout the campaign, unless they start a new game. Irrespective of the player character, each level is played through in the same manner. However, playing as specific characters does often result in different cutscenes and in-game dialogue. For example, in the first level, each of the three characters receives a phone call at different points, but the player can only hear what is said during the player character's conversation; thus, to hear all three phone calls, the player must play through the level three times, using a different character each time.

Each character can wield handguns, rifles, heavy and light machine guns, shotguns, and grenades. Each can interact with certain objects, such as ammo, weaponry, and collectables. Each can also drive vehicles when available, or ride shotgun if necessary. Each can also avail of "Team Cover", a special game mechanic only available at predetermined points whereby the under-fire player can move from designated cover spot to designated cover spot, with their companions automatically offering covering fire as they move.

Screenshot of gameplay in Call of Juarez: The Cartel; the image shows the player controlling McCall, with both Evans and Guerra visible on screen as his AI-controlled partners.

The main differences between the three characters pertain to their weaponry. McCall gets a damage bonus when using handguns and heavy machine guns, whilst his speciality skill is rapid reloading of handguns. He's also stronger and slower than the others and can take more damage in both gunfights and melee combat. Evans gets a damage bonus when using rifles and sniper rifles, whilst her speciality skill is enhanced focus when zoomed in on a target and the ability to hold her breath when using a sniper rifle. She's weaker and faster than the others and is the only character who can simultaneously run and zoom. Guerra gets a damage bonus when using light machine guns and shotguns, whilst his speciality skill is the ability to dual wield SMGs. His strength and speed fall between McCall and Evans – he's faster and weaker than McCall but tougher and slower than Evans.

Each mission in the game features a series of primary objectives, which must be completed sequentially as the player moves through the map. Certain levels also feature optional side quests called "Secret Agenda" missions. In these missions, which are different for each of the characters, the player character will receive a phone call asking them to retrieve something hidden within the map. Not only must they find the item, but to get the full experience points and complete the mission successfully, they must collect it unseen by the other two characters. When playing in co-op mode, if a player is seen taking the secret agenda item, they get 50% of the available experience, with the other 50% going to the player who saw them. Experience allows the player to level up, with different weaponry made available for use at each level.

The game features two types of slow-motion attacks ("Concentration Mode"). Irrespective of the character, players charge their concentration metre by killing enemies, with headshots charging the meter faster than body shots. Once the player has filled the meter, they can activate concentration mode at any time. When they do, time slows down dramatically, but the player can still pivot, shoot, and reload at near-normal speed. In co-op play, when one player triggers their concentration mode, it also triggers for all other human players. The second type of concentration mode is dual concentration, which happens automatically at certain points in the game, always at doorways. The player character and one of the AI characters (or two player characters in co-op mode) simultaneously burst into the room, and the game goes into slow motion for several seconds.

=== Multiplayer ===
The game's multiplayer mode is available via LAN and online on Microsoft Windows, LAN and the PlayStation Network on PlayStation 3, and System Link and Xbox Live on the Xbox 360. All three versions feature two types of multiplayer; cooperative and competitive. Cooperative gameplay allow up to three players team up to complete campaign missions. When playing cooperatively, the game features random challenges throughout each level (this feature is not available in single-player mode). These challenges may include objectives such as hitting a certain number of headshots, avoiding damage, or getting to a certain part of the level. All human players (whether two or three) receive the same challenges at the same time, and the first to complete the challenge gets the experience points.

Competitive mode is traditional player v. player gameplay for up to twelve players, with two game types available - "Objective Based" and "Team Deathmatch". Both game types use a "cop v. criminal" system, where one team is the cops and the other is the criminals. In objective-based gameplay, players set out to either engage in criminal activity or prevent the other team from doing so, with a series of objectives to be completed or prevented. All games also use a partner system whereby any two players on the same team can team up. If they remain close to one another, they get benefits such as extra experience or health. Additionally, if one partner sees an opponent, but the other partner does not, that opponent is marked on both partners' mini-maps.

== Plot ==
The game begins as the fledgling but powerful Mendoza Cartel bomb the DEA's offices in Los Angeles, killing seven agents. In response, Deputy Attorney General Joseph Reynolds orders Assistant Attorney General Shane Dickson to put together an interagency task force. She selects LAPD detective Ben McCall, FBI agent Kim Evans, and DEA agent Eddie Guerra. She tells the team that FBI agent Patrick Stone, who was killed in the bombing, had been investigating the sale of military-grade weaponry to the cartel. After the bombing, Stone's daughter Jessica contacted McCall and told him that several days prior, her father was threatened by a man named Antonio Alvarez, who was squadmates with both McCall and Stone in Vietnam.

After causing chaos to the cartel's street operations, the team learn that Alvarez is scheduled to take delivery of a sizeable amount of cash. En route to the exchange, Guerra's bookie calls and tells him his $70,000 debt has been paid off, much to his confusion. After the exchange is made, the team give chase, with Alvarez fleeing on foot. While Evans pursues, she is called by FBI Assistant Director Allen Waters and told that Alvarez is an FBI informant, and is not to be arrested. Nevertheless, the team are able to get the money Alvarez was carrying.

Later, Guerra gets a call from whoever paid off his debt, telling him that they want Jessica moved to a less secure location. As Guerra reluctantly obliges, they are attacked en route, although they manage to escape. Seeing that Jessica has a missed call from Kevin Donleavy, a former FBI agent who worked with her father, the team have her ring him back, whereupon he tells her that her father sent something to him; evidence of a conspiracy that "goes all the way to the top." Jessica arranges to meet Donleavy in a rooftop bar. Guerra is again contacted by his creditors and is told they no longer need Jessica, now they just need Donleavey's evidence. Evans is informed that Donleavy is working for the cartel, and follows an order to shoot him. This prompts Jessica to flee, pursued by Alvarez, who was also in the bar.

The team then learn that Jesus Mendoza, son of Juan Mendoza, the cartel's leader, is coming to LA to handle the arms deal. They apprehend Jesus, learning that the cartel is buying the weapons from Peace Keepers International, a private military company run by Michael Duke. Alvarez tells Evans that Donleavy was not working for the cartel and offers intel on the exchange with Duke in exchange for custody of Jesus. He also confirms that the cartel has apprehended Jessica. McCall, however, contacts Juan directly, offering Jesus in exchange for Jessica, to which Juan agrees.

At the prisoner exchange, Alvarez kills both Jessica and Jesus. He then offers a new deal - the location of the weapon trade in return for the money the team stole during the money exchange. Donleavy's evidence proves to be an audio recording in which Stone reveals that Dickson is working with the cartel. McCall reluctantly agrees to Alvarez's deal, and the team heads to the location; an old fort in Juarez (the same fort occupied by Juan Mendoza in the previous games), where they kill all of Duke and Juan's men and steal the trucks with the weaponry and money.

As Alvarez manipulates Juan and Duke into each believing that the other is responsible for the heist, Evans tells Waters that Dickson is working with the cartel, and they are planning to arrest Juan, as they need his testimony to convict Dickson and attest to the conspiracy. At Jesus' funeral, Duke attacks and is killed. The team pursue Juan and Alvarez to Juan's hacienda. Juan surrenders, but is immediately killed by a US military drone operated by Dickson. After cornering Alvarez, McCall wants to kill him for his crimes, Evans wants him alive so Dickson can go to prison, and Guerra wants to split the drug money three ways. Alvarez also reveals that it was the FBI who paid off Guerra's debts so they would have leverage over him in the future. Each draws their weapon, and the player is presented with a choice of whether or not to kill their teammates.

There are four possible endings. If the player chooses not to kill their teammates, Alvarez is taken alive and testifies against Dickson, leading to her arrest. Guerra and Evans are arrested for leaking Jessica's location and killing Donleavy, respectively. The game ends with McCall visiting Stone and Jessica's grave. If the player chooses to kill their teammates, Alvarez detonates a grenade and escapes. If McCall is the player character, he is subsequently arrested, while the U.S. considers invading Mexico as the Mendoza cartel spreads into the highest echelons of government. If Evans is the player character, she is awarded the FBI Medal of Valor by Dickson at a press conference but is arrested after assaulting Dickson. If Guerra is the player character, he is later assassinated in a hotel room, while Dickson is congratulated by the U.S. president on TV. The game ends with either McCall (if he is the player character) or Dickson looking at a postcard sent by Alvarez, which states: "happiness is having friends in high places."

== Development ==
Ubisoft announced The Cartel in February 2011, revealing that Techland, who had developed both of the previous titles (Call of Juarez and Call of Juarez: Bound in Blood), would be returning. Explaining that the game would be set in the modern day, Ubisoft's director of marketing, Adam Novickas, stated, "the game will bring the best elements of the Wild West into modern times with a very gritty and relevant plot." The decision to relocate the game from the Wild West to the modern day was met with skepticism by many. After a non-playable demo was shown at PAX in March, IGN's Martin Robinson wrote, "it looks like Call of Juarez has ditched its one point of distinction, exposing an insipid shooter that's lost a fistful of charm in the process." Similarly, GameSpot's Jane Douglas wrote, "as unlikely decisions go, setting a Wild West franchise's third installment in 21st-century Los Angeles and Mexico ranks on par with a disco-era Prince of Persia reboot."

Reacting to this general skepticism, Ubisoft producer Samuel Jacques stated, "we wanted to offer something fresh for the player and give more variety. We were quite limited by the classical Wild West setting. The new setting will bring some variety to the shooting experience." In an interview with GameSpot, Techland's project coordinator Błażej Krakowiak explained, "we moved the franchise to a modern setting because we felt the Wild West values and experience are universal [...] we, of course want to keep the fans of the franchise happy, because we are fans of the western and we have a lot of experience making it, but we also wanted to make it accessible and attractive to a new audience." When asked what he would say to fans who weren't happy with the change, he said, "you should trust us. This is a great western game." Further addressing this issue, in a GamingBolt interview in April, Ubisoft said,

during the development of Bound in Blood people kept asking us whether the traditional Western was still relevant in modern times. We kept saying "of course" and we still believe it. It's because Westerns are universal: the Wild West is more than just time and place. Bringing the Call of Juarez franchise into modern times allows us to prove that we mean it. When you consider the iconic ingredients of a Western, you can easily find them today: the unique locations and landscapes didn't really change much since the Old West [...] There are still people who feel above the law and the only people who can stop them are the real men, the gunslingers who aren't afraid to step into the grey area between right and wrong. An interesting hero is never simply 'good'. Conflict is much more interesting and in the world of The Cartel there is plenty of it. Of course we're a little nervous bringing the story into a new reality but we're also confident that the Modern Wild West we're introducing will feel familiar to fans.

Speaking of the game's design, Ubisoft said they had responded to fan feedback from Bound in Blood which overwhelmingly called for a co-op mode. The other major issue fans identified was that the Bound in Blood single-player campaign was too short, which the designers of The Cartel addressed by encouraging players to play through the game multiple times, playing as a different character each time; "while there is one storyline in the game, each character has a different point of view on the event. That changes the experience."

Narrative and aesthetic influences on the game included The Shield, Sons of Anarchy, and 24. The game was built using the fifth iteration of Techland's in-house game engine, Chrome, and according to the developers, several individual levels, such as one set in a packed nightclub, feature more assets than the entirety of Bound in Blood. The engine allowed for advanced screen space ambient occlusion, custom anti-aliasing, and texture filtering, with anisotropic filtering allowing for smoother transitions between mipmap levels. The engine can also handle complex and dynamic light shafts and features advanced A-buffering (used for displaying smoke, fire and particles). The game's frame rate was capped at 30FPS on consoles, reducing screen tearing and aiding visual consistency. V-sync automatically disengages when performance drops below 30FPS.

On June 29, a month before the game's release, IGN published an article called "Call of Juarez: The Cartel Should Be Delayed", in which Ray Gallegos argued that the game was nowhere near release quality; "I've seen games a year out that are in significantly better shape." Having recently sampled both single-player and multiplayer, he wrote, "it looks like an original Xbox game right now and performs badly. Its visuals make it look like a title that's an afterthought; one that needs some serious attention to be brought up to a competitive place amongst the rest of shooters out this year."

=== Digital storefront removal ===
On March 31, 2018, without any indication as to why, The Cartel and Gunslinger were removed from Steam, the PlayStation Store, and Xbox Live. On April 12, Ubisoft explained that the reason for the removal was "per the terms of agreement, Call of Juarez: The Cartel and Call of Juarez: Gunslinger licensing/publishing rights have reverted back to Techland, while others remain active with Ubisoft. This is why a few titles have recently been removed, but it is our understanding that Techland is working to bring those titles back." Gunslinger returned to all three platforms on April 30, with Techland stating, "as Techland Publishing moves forward as a leading publisher, we are delighted to welcome Call of Juarez: Gunslinger to our publishing division." Techland promised that information on The Cartel's return would be provided "at a later date", but no such information was ever released, and the game remains unavailable on Steam, the PlayStation Store, and GOG.com.

== Reception ==
Reception

Aggregate score
Aggregator	Score		
Aggregator	PC	PS3	Xbox 360
Metacritic	51/100	45/100	47/100

Review scores
Publication	Score		
Publication	PC	PS3	Xbox 360
Destructoid		2.5/10	
Eurogamer			6/10
Game Informer		4.5/10	
GameSpot	5.5/10	5.5/10	6/10
IGN	4.5/10	4.5/10	4.5/10
PlayStation Official Magazine – Australia		4/10	
Official Xbox Magazine (UK)			4/10
Official Xbox Magazine (US)			4.5/10
PALGN			3/10
PC Gamer (UK)	35%		
PlayStation: The Official Magazine		2.5/5	

Call of Juarez: The Cartel received "generally unfavourable" reviews across all systems, with the PC version holding an aggregate score of 51 out of 100 on Metacritic, based on fourteen reviews, the PlayStation 3 version holding a score of 45 out of 100, based on forty-two reviews, and the Xbox 360 version holding a score of 47 out of 100, based on sixty-two reviews.

GameSpot's Kevin VanOrd scored the PC and PlayStation 3 versions 6.5 out of 10 and the Xbox 360 version 6 out of 10. He liked the idea of the secret agendas, but he was critical of the shooting mechanics, lack of character development, poor dialogue, bad voice acting, poorly animated cutscenes, and the general glitches and lack of technical polish. In relation to the audio, he cited characters speaking over one another, unexplained reverb, and subtitles which didn't match the spoken dialogue. He concluded, "the potential is hard to see hiding behind all the glitches and obscenities." Eurogamer's Dan Whitehead scored the Xbox 360 version 6 out of 10. He praised the storyline, the secret agenda mechanic, and the basic shooting gameplay, but he was critical of the "sloppy production values", citing subtitles that didn't match the dialogue and characters speaking over one another. He concluded, "it's a workmanlike experience, but not without its charm."

Game Informer's Dan Ryckert scored the PlayStation 3 version 4.5 out of 10, calling it "generic and glitchy." He praised the idea of the secret agendas, but was critical of the glitches, citing abrupt loads, inconsistent frame rates, enemies appearing out of thin air, floating characters, NPCs stuck in animation loops, and poor grammar and spelling in the subtitles. He concluded, "the game is generic at best, broken at worst." IGN's Anthony Gallegos scored all three versions 4.5 out of 10, calling it "rushed, unpolished, and repetitive." He was highly critical of the graphical glitches, noting poor texture mapping and animations, a lot of pop-in, empty environments, constant clipping, and NPCs disappearing and then reappearing in a different location. He also called multiplayer "mundane", and concluded, "it's not the worst shooter I've played, but it's got all the problems of a budget title and few redeeming qualities."

Official Xbox Magazine's Andrew Hayward scored the Xbox 360 version 4.5 out of 10, calling the characters "absolutely insufferable." He found co-op to be "intriguing", but was very critical of AI in single-player games. He was especially unimpressed with the glitches, noting poor animations, clipping, animation loops, floating characters, subtitles riddled with typos, and vehicles spinning in the air. He concluded, "much of this game demonstrates a lack of care and an inattention to detail." Writing for the magazine's UK edition, Ben Talbot scored it 4 out of 10, finding the storyline "bumbling" and the game "ugly in every conceivable way."

Writing for Australia's PlayStation Official Magazine, Adam Mathew scored the PlayStation 3 version 4 out of 10, calling it "a total bust". Of the graphics, he noted, "a criminal amount of environment reuse", and felt that the game was rushed, calling it "buggy, ugly, and uninspired." PC Gamer's Tom Senior scored the PC version 35%, calling it "a steaming turd", "bland, repetitive, and dull," and "brainless, generic and devoid of personality", citing "pathetic guns, horrible characters, and stupid enemies." Calling it "one ugly game", he concluded, "Call of Juarez: The Cartel could be the worst game of 2011."

PALGN's Cian Hassett scored the Xbox 360 version 3 out of 10, calling it "rubbish in almost every conceivable way", citing "flimsy gameplay, idiotic AI, and some of the worst driving sequences you'll ever be forced into screaming through." Destructoid's James Stephanie Sterling scored the PlayStation 3 version 2.5 out of 10, calling it "a by-the-numbers first-person-shooter with only half-hearted attempts to stand out from the pack." They were heavily critical of the glitches, writing, "Call of Juarez looks and sounds like a school project". They felt that the game was so poorly made, it should have been a budget title, calling its full-price status "disingenuous and shameful". They concluded, "Call of Juarez: The Cartel is a sloppy serving from people who should know better, and ought to be ashamed of themselves."

== Controversies ==
Less than two weeks after the game's announcement, before any major plot details or gameplay images or videos had been revealed, community leaders in both El Paso and Juarez spoke out against the game, accusing it of glorifying cartel violence and exploiting very real suffering. In Juarez, youth worker Laurencio Barraza stated, "lots of kids say they want to be a hitman, because they are the ones that get away with everything. This glorifies violence, as if victims were just another number or another bonus." In El Paso, Gomecindo Lopez, of the El Paso County Sheriff's Office, compared the game to the narcocorridos ("drug ballads") that portray drug trafficking and cartel leaders in a positive light; "this goes along the lines of narco-songs that portray cartel leaders as heroes, but both are a gross misrepresentation of who they are. They are criminals". In response, Ubisoft stated,

Call of Juarez: The Cartel is purely fictional and developed by the team at Techland for entertainment purposes only. While Call of Juarez: The Cartel touches on subjects relevant to current events in Juarez, it does so in a fictional manner that makes the gaming experience feel more like being immersed in an action-movie than in a real-life situation.

Three days later, state legislators in Chihuahua asked the Secretariat of the Interior to ban the game outright, a request which had been unanimously approved by the state legislature. They argued that seeing the region's real-life violence depicted as entertainment in a video game would desensitise youths to the horrors of that violence. Congressman Ricardo Salmon stated, "we should not expose children to this kind of scenarios [sic] so that they are going to grow up with this kind of image and lack of values [sic]". State congress leader Enrique Serrano argued, "children wind up being easily involved in criminal acts over time, because among other things, during their childhood not enough care has been taken about what they see on television and playing video games. They believe so much blood and death is normal".

After the game was released, James Portnow, writing for Extra Credits, criticised an achievement for killing 40 or more enemies, on the only level in the game where there are African-Americans, and no enemies other than African-Americans (he also noted this is the only achievement for killing a certain number of people in the entire game). He stated, "this might be the most racist game I've ever played by a major publisher," arguing that "the entire game is about the evils of minorities, about their criminal behaviour and how we should put them down." He also echoed the concerns of those in El Paso, Juarez, and Chihuahua, arguing that the game "does not respect the lives that have been lost in this conflict". Furthermore, he criticised the game's depiction of sex trafficking as involving cartels coming to the US and kidnapping American women for sale in Mexico; the real-life practice is the opposite - they kidnap Mexican women and sell them in the US.

In an interview with Eurogamer in 2015, Paweł Marchewka, the CEO of Techland and the game's lead designer, said that The Cartel was a "mistake", adding that while the game was not "bad", it was not ready when it was launched. This issue was further addressed in a 2018 Game Informer interview with Krzysztof Nosek, the game's multiplayer lead programmer. According to Nosek, from December 2010 to May 2011, due to some "unlucky business negotiations" with Ubisoft, Techland found themselves with not enough time to finish the game and thus they were forced to crunch, which compromised the quality of the work; "we all had the enthusiasm and drive to create a good game, but there simply weren't enough hours around the clock to fit everything in. Out of exhaustion, we were making stupid mistakes." Even staff who had completed their work on the game had to work longer hours; "the atmosphere was that all hands must be on deck since it would be a hit to team morale if some people didn't sit and crunch while others did." Paweł Zawodny, the game's producer, confirms this, saying that for the last few months of development, he was a "mindless zombie".
