= Call of Juarez: Bound in Blood =

2009 first-person shooter video game

- European cover art
- Developer: Techland
- Publisher: Ubisoft
- Producer: Paweł Zawodny
- Designers: Paweł Marchewka; Jakub Klarowicz
- Programmers: Bartosz Bień; Grzegorz Świstowski; Marcin Żygadło
- Artist: Paweł Selinger
- Writers: Paweł Selinger; Haris Orkin
- Composer: Paweł Błaszczak
- Series: Call of Juarez
- Engine: Chrome Engine 4
- Platforms: PlayStation 3; Windows; Xbox 360
- Release: NA: June 30, 2009; AU: July 2, 2009; EU: July 3, 2009
- Genre: First-person shooter
- Modes: Single-player, multiplayer

Call of Juarez: Bound in Blood (Polish: Call of Juarez: Więzy Krwi) is a 2009 Western-themed first-person shooter for PlayStation 3, Windows, and Xbox 360. Developed by Techland and published by Ubisoft, it was released in North America in June 2009 and in Australia and Europe in July. In December 2011, it was made available on the PlayStation Store and the Xbox Games Store, in November 2018, it was added to Microsoft's backward compatibility program, making it playable on the Xbox One and Xbox Series X/S, and in September 2019, it was released on GOG.com. It is the second game in the Call of Juarez series, although narratively, it is a prequel to the first game.

With the majority of the story taking place eighteen years prior to the first game, Bound in Blood focuses on the McCall brothers; Ray and Thomas, who are fighting in the American Civil War. In August 1864, as the conflict is nearing its end, they abandon their post to try to save their family home. Labelled deserters, they go on the run with their younger brother William, a trainee priest. Two years later, hiding out in Mexico, they meet the bandit Juan 'Juarez' Mendoza and his girlfriend Marisa, and first encounter the legend of the Gold of Juarez. With their army commander still pursuing them, they enter into a dangerous alliance with Mendoza and an Apache tribe in order to find the gold. However, both brothers find themselves falling in love with Marisa.

In making Bound in Blood, Techland looked at the reception of the first game and removed the much-maligned stealth and platforming elements. Drawing inspiration from a variety of films and television, they sought to make something that would fall somewhere between a Spaghetti Western and a more traditional classical Hollywood western. So whilst the game's violence is over the top, its themes were modelled after the real-life issues of the day, with the script touching upon such topics as the psychological effects of the American Civil War on those who fought it, Mexican banditry, racism, and white suppression and displacement of Native Americans.

Bound in Blood received mainly positive reviews. Most critics found it better than the original, and many praised the plot, shooting mechanics, authentic western tone, voice acting, and multiplayer. Criticism focused on poor enemy AI, repetitive level design, and, especially, the lack of any kind of co-op mode. The game was a commercial success, selling over one million units worldwide across all three systems, considerably more than the first game.

== Gameplay ==
Bound in Blood is a first-person shooter in which the player controls one of two protagonists: Ray McCall or his brother Thomas, each of whom has a different style of gameplay. Whereas in the original Call of Juarez, the player controlled alternating characters from level to level, in Bound in Blood, most levels offer the player the choice of which character to play as. The character which the player does not choose is controlled by the AI for the duration of the level. There are also occasional levels through which the player must play with a specific character.

In many levels, there will be times when the brothers will have to directly help one another, such as Thomas helping Ray to reach a high platform, or Ray kicking down a door for Thomas. Most levels are played through in the same manner, irrespective of which character is chosen, with the only difference being that of gameplay. Occasionally, however, the brothers will separate within a level (such as Ray going through a mine, and Thomas going over it), and in these cases, the level design will be different depending on which character the player is using.

Gameplay in Bound in Blood. The gold star on screen indicates the location of the mission objective; the black cowboy hat indicates the location of the AI-controlled brother.

Although the style of play for both characters is different, controlling each character is broadly similar. Each shares an identical HUD, with the same information available to the player. Both can wield handguns, rifles, and shotguns. Both can interact with certain objects, such as cash dropped by enemies, ammo, and weaponry. Both can ride horses, from which they can shoot and enter gallop mode. Both characters can also avail of the same automatic cover system, which allows them to "snap" to surfaces and then peer left, right and, if the surface is a crate, over the top.

The main differences between the two characters are that Ray is stronger and slower, he cannot jump as high as Thomas, but he can kick doors down and take considerably more damage from enemy fire, due to wearing a cuirass. He cannot aim as far as Thomas, but he is faster with six-shooters, which he can dual wield, and is quicker when aiming at nearby enemies. Thomas can move faster than Ray and is quieter, allowing him to sneak up on enemies. He can also grip onto ledges and pull himself up. He has a better long-range aim than Ray but is slower when using six-shooters, which he can only single wield, and when aiming at nearby enemies. Ray can use two weapons that Thomas cannot – a dismountable gatling gun and throwable dynamite. Thomas can use three weapons that Ray cannot – a lasso, a bow, and throwing knives. When Thomas uses the bow, the player has the option of going into slow motion for more precise aiming or firing at normal speed. His use of the lasso requires the player to point the crosshairs at an appropriate spot, and then move the analog stick or mouse in a circular motion, mimicking the action of using an actual lasso. Once sufficient speed has been reached, the lasso will be thrown automatically.

Aside from using the bow, there are three types of slow-motion attacks in the game, called "Concentration modes". Ray and Thomas's concentration modes are charged by killing enemies, with headshots charging their meters faster than body shots. Once the player has filled their concentration meter, they have sixty seconds in which to activate it, or it empties by half, and must be recharged. In Ray's mode, once slow motion begins, Ray is free to rotate 360 degrees from a fixed position. If the crosshairs pass over an enemy, that enemy will be "tagged". Ray can tag up to the maximum number of bullets in his guns (usually twelve, although some guns carry more than six shots). This means up to twelve enemies can be tagged (or less than twelve enemies can be tagged multiple times), but the amount of time the player has to do so is limited. Once the time is up, Ray automatically fires at all tagged enemies with near-perfect accuracy. In Thomas's concentration mode, the player does not need to manually aim. Instead, the crosshairs automatically move from visible enemy to visible enemy, pausing on each one momentarily. As the crosshairs move, the player must hold down the fire button, and when the crosshairs pause, the player must pull back on the analog stick or mouse to fire at the target (mimicking the action of real-life fanning). The third type of concentration mode is dual concentration, which happens automatically at certain points of the game, always at doorways. Ray and Thomas simultaneously burst into the room, and the game goes into slow motion, with two targeting reticles appearing on either side of the screen, each moving towards the centre. The player cannot control the movement of either reticle, nor can they move the character during concentration mode, but they can control the positioning of the screen, allowing them to manoeuvre their vision to shoot when the reticles pass over an enemy. They can also shoot independently from either their left or right gun, or both simultaneously.

A duel in Bound in Blood. Players must keep the character's hand as close to their gun as possible using the left analog stick or mouse, whilst simultaneously using the right analog stick or keyboard to move the camera so as to keep the enemy centered. A bell rings when the player can draw their weapon.

The game also features numerous duels. In these shootouts, the game switches to third-person and the character and enemy slowly circle one another, with the player needing to keep the character's hand as close to his gun as possible. However, they cannot touch their gun, as if they do, their hand is automatically moved away. At the same time, the player needs to keep the opponent lined up in the centre of the screen. When the time comes to draw, a bell rings, and the player has a very brief window in which to draw, aim, and fire.

=== Multiplayer ===
The game's multiplayer mode is available via LAN and online on Microsoft Windows, via LAN and the PlayStation Network on PlayStation 3, and via System Link and Xbox Live on Xbox 360. All three versions feature the same game types; "Shootout" (deathmatch), "Posse" (team deathmatch), "Wanted" (one player is randomly designated as the "wanted" player, and other players can only score points by killing this particular player. Once the wanted player is killed, the player who killed them then becomes the wanted player. The player with the most points at the end of the game wins), "Manhunt" (team "wanted" game in which one player is randomly designated as the wanted player. If they survive sixty seconds, their team scores a point. If they are killed, the player who killed them becomes the wanted player. The team with the most points at the end of the game wins), and "Wild West Legends" (game scenarios based on real-life events, such as the Battle of Antietam, the Dalton gang's last raid, the Frisco Shootout, the Skeleton Canyon shootout, and the O.K. Corral, in which one team are the "Lawmen" and the other team are the "Outlaws". The Outlaws have a series of objectives and a limited time in which to complete them. The Lawmen must try to prevent them from accomplishing their objectives).

Multiplayer mode features thirteen classes, each with its own strengths, weaknesses, and weaponry. Classes available immediately are "Gunslinger", "Rifleman", "Miner", "Sniper", and "Native". Unlockable classes are "Scout", "Trapper", "Gunsmith", "Hombre", "Spy", "Officer", "Duelist", and "Veteran". Multiplayer games employ a "bounty system" for scoring - the more kills a player gets, the more his/her bounty increases, and hence the more points are awarded to any player that kills them. This bounty system is used in all game modes, on all maps, and with all character classes. Money earned during multiplayer games can be used to unlock character classes or to upgrade the class currently being used within the game. Upgrades are in two levels; the first cancels out the classes' weaknesses, the second increases the classes' strengths. If the player switches classes mid-game having already upgraded another class, their upgrades will not carry across to the new class. However, if they switch back to the previously upgraded class, their upgrades will remain. Upgrades, however, do not carry across to different games.

== Plot ==
In 1864, brothers Ray and Thomas McCall are sergeants in the Confederate States Army, fighting in the American Civil War. After a successful battle near the Chattahoochee River, they are ordered by their commanding officer, Colonel Jeremy Barnsby, to retreat to Jonesboro to reinforce supply lines. They refuse to comply, and instead desert to try to save their nearby home from the approaching Union Army. They arrive too late, however, finding the house partially destroyed, their mother dead, and their younger brother William, a trainee priest, by her bedside. Vowing to return and rebuild the house in the future, the three leave. Meanwhile, Barnsby vows to track them down and hang them for their desertion. Shortly thereafter, the Union proves victorious in the war, but Barnsby refuses to surrender and continues hunting the McCalls.

In 1866, the brothers are in San Lorenzo where Ray has heard of a lost Aztec treasure called the "Gold of Juarez", and despite it apparently being cursed, he hopes they can find it and use it to rebuild their home. William, however, is growing concerned at their increasingly lawless behavior. Meanwhile, Running River, an Apache chief, makes plans to wage war on the white man. He sends his son, Seeing Farther, to purchase rifles in Mexico, authorizing him to trade a medallion that reveals the location of the gold. In San Lorenzo, Ray and Thomas make the acquaintance of Juan 'Juarez' Mendoza, a powerful bandit, and his girlfriend, Marisa, with whom Ray immediately becomes infatuated. Mendoza reveals he too is looking for the gold, and promises them a share if they help him find it. They agree and William notes that whilst Ray looks lustfully at Marisa, she looks at Thomas the same way.

Mendoza introduces the brothers to Seeing Farther, who has come to him to purchase the rifles. The group heads to Arizona to meet a gun runner, who (unseen by the brothers) turns out to be Barnsby. He tells Mendoza if he wants the rifles, he must hand over the McCalls. Meanwhile, Marisa tells Thomas she is in love with him, whilst William acknowledges that Ray and Thomas are now fully-fledged outlaws and no longer talk about rebuilding their home. Barnsby learns about the medallion and allows the brothers to follow Mendoza into Apache territory, planning to pursue them and use the gold to raise a new Confederate army.

The McCalls and Mendoza meet with Running River, but when he sees that Mendoza was trying to swindle him by selling him useless rifles, he orders them all killed. Seeing Farther, however, intervenes and bargains for their lives. Running River reluctantly agrees not to kill them but takes Marisa as payment for his troubles. Mendoza leaves, and the McCalls go to the Apache village. Seeing Farther agrees to help them find the medallion so as to prevent Running River using it to buy other rifles, as he fears the curse will destroy the Apache. Infiltrating Navajo territory, they retrieve the medallion, with Seeing Farther entrusting it to William and explaining how to use it.

Shortly thereafter, Barnsby attacks the village. Most of the Apache are massacred, and although Ray, Thomas, and Running River survive, Seeing Farther is taken hostage. Ray and Thomas attempt to rescue him, but Barnsby mortally wounds him. Dying, he says he was captured by Mendoza and handed over to Barnsby, and William and Marisa are being held captive by Mendoza in his alcázar. The brothers wipe out Barnsby's men and leave Running River to kill Barnsby. Speaking to his dead son, Running River renounces his life of violence, stating that from now on, he will live a life of peace and be known as Calm Water.

Meanwhile, Mendoza interrogates William, but William refuses to explain how to use the medallion. Marisa tells William she is pregnant with Mendoza's child, and admits she truly does love Thomas. As Ray and Thomas storm the alcázar, Mendoza orders William executed, and Marisa steals the medallion. She tells Thomas she knows how to use it, and they must do so now, as William is already dead. Thomas reluctantly agrees to leave Ray behind. Meanwhile, Ray prevents William's death and shoots Mendoza, but is unable to find the body. He and William then escape, with Ray beside himself with rage.

Heading to the location of the gold, they encounter Thomas and Marisa in the chamber. The two brothers face off, but William steps between them. He pretends he is about to draw a gun, and Ray shoots him. In actuality, he was taking out his bible. The chamber is then attacked by Barnsby, whom Running River chose not to kill. The McCalls kill him and admit that perhaps the gold really is cursed, and so they leave it behind. William's sacrifice compels Ray to renounce violence and become a preacher. Thomas and Marisa are married, and the three head to Texas. Marisa wears the medallion as an amulet, which she plans to give to her child when he is born.

== Development ==
Bound in Blood was announced in January 2009, with Ubisoft partnering with the developers of the original Call of Juarez game, Techland, to release a prequel for Microsoft Windows, PlayStation 3, and Xbox 360. The developers had taken on board the most common criticisms of the first game (mainly concerning the platforming and stealth sections), whilst enhancing the mechanics of the original that received the most praise, namely Reverend Ray's gameplay. Speaking of the game from a technological standpoint, lead product manager Paweł Kopiński said it would be the first game to utilize the fourth iteration of Techland's own in-house game engine, the Chrome Engine, which would allow for considerable graphical improvements over the original;

we've managed to achieve increased performance allowing for even more polygons on screen and advanced special effects. While we focused on the game's core strength, its shooting mechanics, we're also very proud of the enhanced wide open environments and natural wildlife.

Unlike Chrome Engine 3, Chrome Engine 4 used deferred rendering, which allowed for more advanced lighting and post-processing effects. It was also the first iteration of the engine with "true multi-platform support." Techland also used their own physics engine, based on ODE, which required no hardware acceleration.

Discussing inspirations for the game, Kopiński stated, "we wanted to capture the best of all the western movies we love, so it can't be simply categorized as either a Spaghetti Western or a realistic Western. It's a blend of the best elements from both." According to co-writer Haris Orkin, "it's probably closer now to a Spaghetti Western than a classic John Ford western. We also mixed in a little Deadwood, since that inspired us all as well. I guess I would call it a post-modern western along the lines of Unforgiven or The Wild Bunch." Specific influences included Sergio Leone's Dollars Trilogy and Once Upon a Time in the West (1968), James Mangold's 3:10 to Yuma (2007), and Ed Harris's Appaloosa (2008). The team also drew inspiration from real life, with Orkin stating,

many of the actual outlaws of the time were former confederate soldiers; Jesse James and his brothers, the Youngers. Archie Clement. So the McCalls were based somewhat on those actual outlaws - confederate soldiers who suffered the brutality of war and lost everything they had.

Techland didn't initially plan on making a game that dealt with the American Civil War. It was only when they counted back from Billy's story in the original game that they realized a prequel would coincide with that period of history. Once they made that realization, they embraced it, with Kopiński pointing out, "war and its aftermath bring out the worst in people, pushing them to their limits and pitting individuals against a new, transformed reality. War serves as a catalyst and an excuse for the McCall brothers' story."

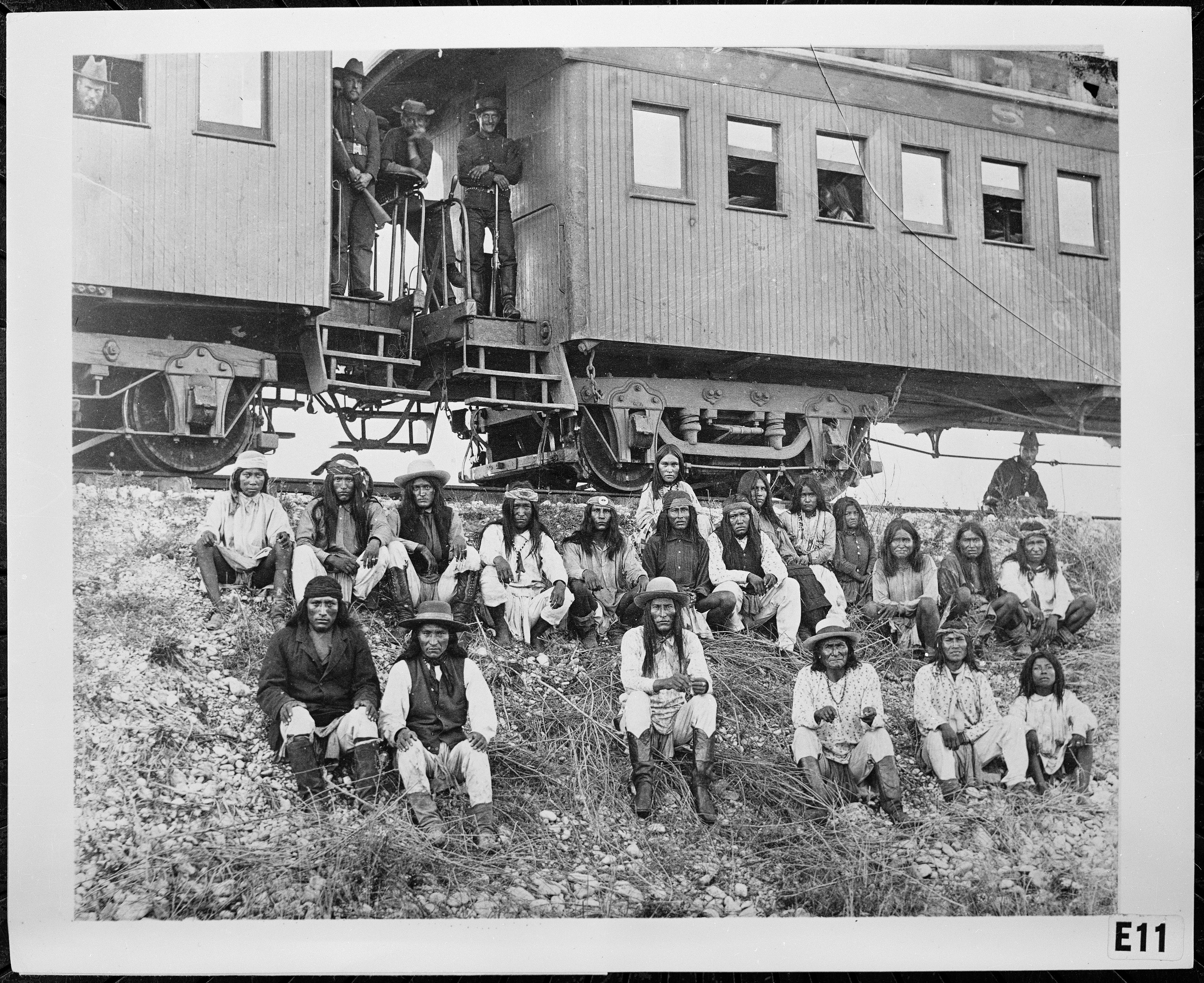
A group of Chiricahua Apache prisoners in Arizona; 1886

When dealing with this period of history, Orkin and Techland approached it with serious intentions, striving to be as historically accurate as possible and deal with some of the real issues of the day, irrespective of whether such issues remain controversial today. Orkin states, "we talk about the white suppression of Native Americans, specifically the Apache, and how that fueled their anger." He furthermore explains, "we deal with issues like racism, slavery, and the oppression of Native Americans and Mexicans in south Texas. Once you go into those worlds and create a story around them, to skirt those truths or pretend they don't exist does them a disservice."

The time period allowed the developers to use specific groups of real-life people in a historically accurate manner, such as the Apache, the Comanche, the Navajo and the Pinkertons. However, Kopiński confessed that in some areas, the game did take liberties with historical actuality;

when it comes to guns, we had to choose between history and the beloved Spaghetti Westerns. As is often the case, reality turned out to be much less exciting than legend. During that time, revolvers were still very unreliable, and double-barreled shotguns were the most popular weapons in the Wild West. That's why Spaghetti Westerns won that particular competition. This means that all weapons are very accurately re-created from their historical counterparts, but just like in everyone's favourite Western movies, they shouldn't really be there yet.

=== Comics ===
Prior to the game's release, Techland published two promotional four-page comics.

"Ray's Story" takes place between Act I: Chapter II and Act I: Chapter III, after the brothers have gone on the run, but before they've arrived in San Lorenzo. In Fort Smith, a group of men are harassing a prostitute in the saloon. When one of them knocks over Ray's whiskey, he demands a fresh bottle, which they refuse. William urges him to leave but is ignored. One of the men shoots Ray in the chest, knocking him down, but he stands back up, revealing his body armour. Then, much to William's horror, he kills all three of the men.

"Billy's Story" takes place fifteen years after Bound in Blood and two years prior to the beginning of the original Call of Juarez. During an argument between Thomas and Billy, Thomas flies into a rage, saying he's glad Billy isn't his son. Billy flees into the barn, chased by Thomas, whilst Marisa fruitlessly appeals for calm. Billy manages to get away from Thomas and vows not to return until he has found the Gold of Juarez. After Billy is gone, Marisa asks Thomas why he has to be so cruel, to which he replies, "I'm trying to teach him how to be a man, but it's a lost cause. He's bad to the bone...just like his father."

== Reception ==
Reception

Aggregate score
| Aggregator | Score | | |
| Aggregator | PC | PS3 | Xbox 360 |
|---|---|---|---|
| Metacritic | 78/100 | 78/100 | 77/100 |

Review scores
| Publication | Score | | |
| Publication | PC | PS3 | Xbox 360 |
|---|---|---|---|
| Computer and Video Games | 8.4/10 | | |
| Eurogamer | | | 7/10 |
| GameSpot | 8/10 | 8/10 | 8/10 |
| GameSpy | | 3/5 | 3/5 |
| IGN | 7.7/10 | 7.5/10 | 7.7/10 |
| PlayStation Official Magazine – UK | | 6/10 | |
| Official Xbox Magazine (UK) | | | 6/10 |
| Official Xbox Magazine (US) | | | 7/10 |
| PALGN | | 8/10 | |
| PC Zone | 80/100 | | |

Bound in Blood received "generally favorable reviews," with the PC and PlayStation 3 versions holding aggregate scores of 78 out of 100 on Metacritic, based on thirty-nine and forty-seven reviews, respectively. The Xbox 360 version holds a score of 77 out of 100, based on seventy-seven reviews.

Computer and Video Games' Richard Cobbett scored the PC version 8.4 out of 10, finding it substantially superior to the original. He criticized the lack of different levels for the two characters, the duel system, and the low difficulty level, but he praised the shooting mechanics and the plot, calling the game "an outstanding FPS [with] excellent shooting and terrific production values." GameSpot's Randolph Ramsay scored all three versions 8 out of 10, calling it "tense, riveting, and superb-looking." He was critical of the short length and ease of the single-player campaign, the enemy AI, and the lack of co-op, but praised the multiplayer, the graphics (especially the use of depth of field), the atmosphere, the script, and the voice acting ("close to pitch perfect"). He concluded, "this game's strong narrative and high production values make it an almost cinematic experience."

PALGN's Michael Kontoudis scored the PlayStation 3 version 8 out of 10, praising the art design, tone, weaponry, duel system, cover system, and voice acting, whilst criticizing the lack of co-op and the ease and length of the single-player campaign. Graphically, he noted some instances of screen tearing, but argued that the game "proves a convincing atmosphere and vibe can overcome most presentational issues." Ultimately, he cited the game as "the best videogame Western ever made." PC Zone's David Brown scored the PC version 80 out of 100, praising the atmosphere, story, shooting mechanics, and Marc Alaimo's voice acting as Ray. On the other hand, he felt the game wasn't as unique as the original and was too derivative of the Call of Duty template.

IGN's Jeff Haynes scored the PC and Xbox 360 versions 7.7 out of 10 and the PlayStation 3 version 7.5 out of 10. Although, he praised the plot, sound, multiplayer, and differentiation in gameplay styles, he was critical of the dueling system, the enemy AI, the level design, and the graphics, citing examples of "bland texture work," pop-in, screen tearing, clipping, and aliasing. He concluded, "the repetitive nature of the missions, coupled with some technical issues, really keeps this title from standing out more." Eurogamer's Oli Walsh scored the Xbox 360 version 7 out of 10, comparing the game unfavorably to the original. Although he praised the plot, tone ("profoundly atmospheric"), gameplay, cover system, and shooting mechanics, he was critical of the repetitiveness of the levels and the graphics, citing examples of tearing, poor animation and inconsistent draw distance. He concluded, "it's far too unvaried a shooting gallery to earn an unhesitating recommendation."

Official Xbox Magazine's Taylor Cocke scored the Xbox 360 version 7 out of 10. He praised the plot ("surprisingly deep and enjoyable") but criticized the voice acting. His biggest criticism was the lack of co-op, whose "absence is completely inexcusable." He concluded, "it's fairly well-done but somewhat basic." Writing for the UK edition of the magazine, Ben Talbot scored it 6 out of 10, calling it "never less than competent", and concluding, "it's not a must-buy by any stretch, but it is bearable."

GameSpy's Eric Neigher scored the PlayStation 3 and Xbox 360 versions 3 out of 5. He criticized the game for bringing nothing new to the first-person shooter genre, and although he praised the storyline, multiplayer, and differentiation between gameplay styles, he was critical of the lack of co-op mode and found the auto-aim made the game too easy. He concluded, "this is an entertaining shooter with many good points, but nothing's particularly outstanding or original here." Writing for the UK's PlayStation Official Magazine, Nathan Ditum scored the PlayStation 3 version 6 out of 10. He was critical of the lack of differentiation between the brothers' gameplay, and he felt the auto-aim and sticky aim made the game far too easy. He concluded, "there's a technologically solid shooter here somewhere, hidden beneath ugliness and questionable design."

=== Sales ===
Bound in Blood was a commercial success, selling considerably more units than the original Call of Juarez. In its first four days of North American release, it sold 24,000 units on the Xbox 360 and 20,000 units on the PlayStation 3. In the United Kingdom, it entered the charts at #6, rising the following month to #4.

By the end of September, the game had sold 900,000 units across all systems, making it one of Ubisoft's best-selling titles for the first half of the fiscal year. Although their overall sales were down 52% from 2008, having earned $247 million by November, compared to the $511 million of the previous year, they cited the strong sales of Bound in Blood and Anno 1404 as high points.

== Downloadable content ==
An "Old West Map Pack" DLC was released in August 2009, containing four new maps for the "Wild West Legends" multiplayer mode (based around the Battle of the Little Bighorn, a gold theft from Vulture Mine, and attempted escapes from a Fort Smith prison and Elmira Prison).
