= Marc Alaimo =

American actor

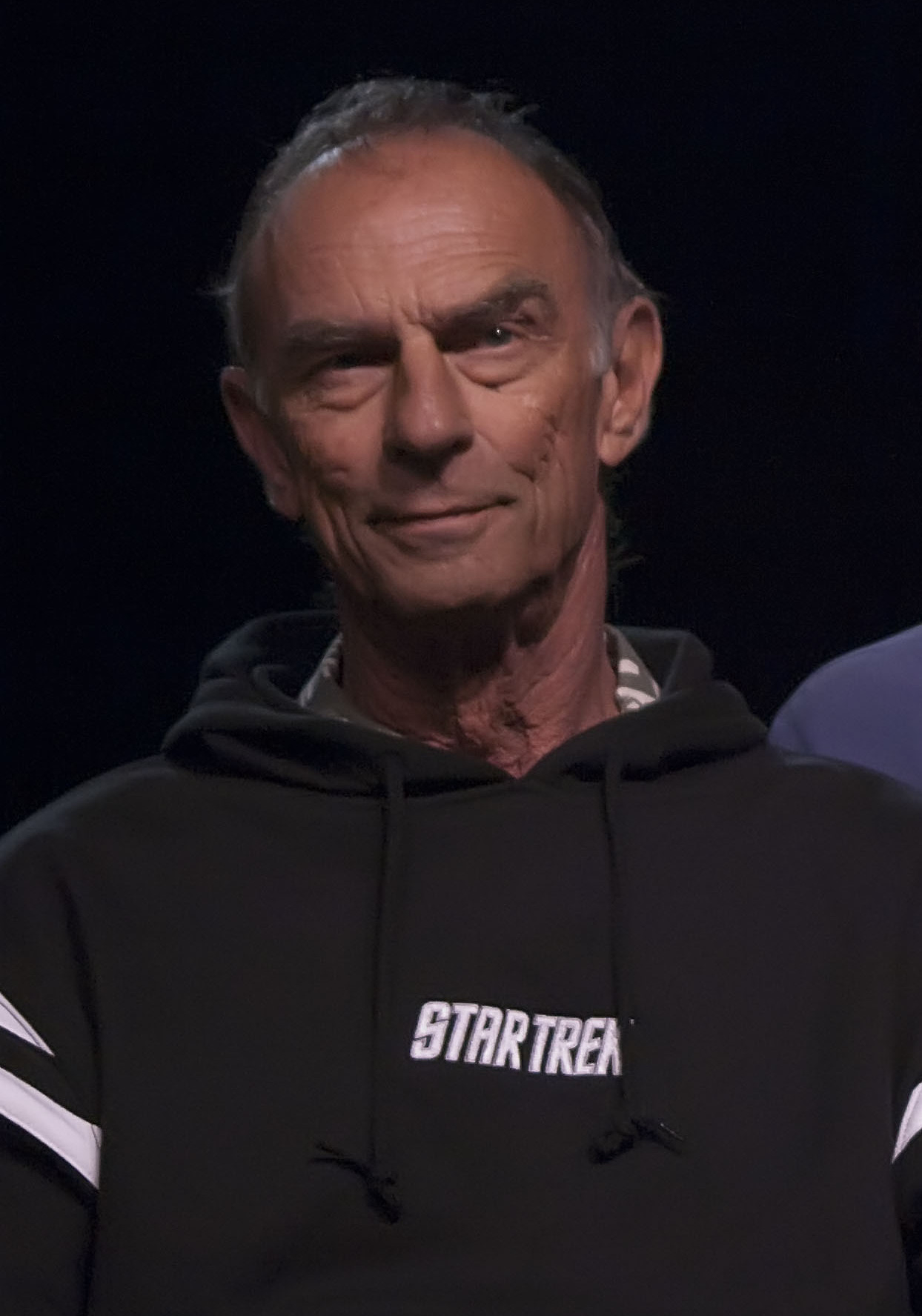
- Alaimo in 2009
- Born: May 5, 1942 (age 84)
- Occupation: Actor
- Years active: 1971–2010
- Children: 2

Marc Alaimo is an American actor known for his villainous roles. He is best known for his role as recurring villain Gul Dukat in the TV series Star Trek: Deep Space Nine.

== Early and personal life ==
Alaimo grew up in Milwaukee, Wisconsin. He has a son from his first marriage, Michael Antony Alaimo, who is a writer, story editor and producer known for The Closer, Major Crimes, Invasion, Traveler, and for penning "Columbo Likes the Nightlife," the final episode of Columbo.

== Career ==
Alaimo is a classically trained theatre actor, and performed as part of the Marquette University Players and the Milwaukee Repertory Theater in the 1960s in everything from Shakespeare and the classics to world premiere productions. He was also a member of various theatre companies in New York and touring companies across the country before making the move to Los Angeles in 1973. Some of his theatrical roles include Iago in Othello, Rodolpho in Arthur Miller's A View From the Bridge and Lucky in Samuel Beckett's Waiting for Godot.

Alaimo has been playing characters in television shows since 1971. He has appeared, mostly as villains, in shows such as The Doctors, Kojak, Gunsmoke, Baretta, The Six Million Dollar Man, The Bionic Woman, Starsky & Hutch, Knight Rider, Quincy, The Greatest American Hero, The Incredible Hulk, Quantum Leap, Family Guy, Walker, Texas Ranger, Wonder Woman, The Rockford Files, Hill Street Blues, Barnaby Jones, and The A-Team. Alaimo has appeared in some feature films including the 1984 science fiction movie The Last Starfighter (portraying the human guise of an alien assassin), Naked Gun 33 1/3: The Final Insult, Tango & Cash, and the 1988 film The Dead Pool. He also appeared as Curtis Block in the television movie Case Closed and as a security officer on Mars in the Arnold Schwarzenegger movie Total Recall.

He played several characters in Star Trek: The Next Generation (Star Trek: TNG), starting in the first season. He has the distinction of two firsts on Star Trek: TNG, playing the first Romulan, Commander Tebok, in the 1988 episode "The Neutral Zone", and the first Cardassian (in any Star Trek series), Gul Macet, in the 1991 episode, "The Wounded". He also played a poker player who speaks French to Data in the episode "Time's Arrow". In 1993, Alaimo began playing Cardassian character Gul Dukat in Star Trek: Deep Space Nine. Gul Dukat was a recurring character that appeared in 35 episodes of the series.

Alaimo also appeared in a season two episode of 21 Jump Street. He was also featured in the 2006 video game Call of Juarez, and its 2009 prequel Call of Juarez: Bound in Blood, both times as the voice of the gunslinging Ray McCall. In 2010 he voiced The Dean in the Family Guy episode "The Splendid Source".

During a Q&A panel at the Star Trek Las Vegas Convention in 2015, Alaimo revealed he was still willing to work as an actor but was out of touch with the industry and had no agency representing him at that time.

== Filmography ==
=== Film ===
Year	Title	Role	Notes
1974	The Execution of Private Slovik	Soldier	TV movie; uncredited
1975	Cage Without a Key	Workman	TV movie
1975	A Matter of Wife... and Death	Angie	TV movie
1976	Dr. Black and Mr. Hyde	Preston, The Pusher	
1977	The 3,000 Mile Chase	Richards	TV movie
1977	Which Way Is Up?	Frankie	
1978	Mean Dog Blues	Transfer Guard	
1979	Hardcore	Ratan	
1979	A Great Ride	Barry	
1979	High Midnight	Gratzek	TV movie
1980	Seems Like Old Times	B.G.	
1981	The Archer: Fugitive from the Empire	Sandros	TV movie
1981	Broken Promise	Joe Clawson	TV movie
1982	The Ambush Murders	Garza	TV movie
1984	No Man's Land	Clay Allison	TV movie
1984	The Last Starfighter	Hitchhiker	
1985	Command 5	Lear Businessman	TV movie
1986	Avenging Force	Charlie Lavall	
1987	Police Story: The Freeway Killings	Lou Morello	TV movie
1987	The Gambler, Part III: The Legend Continues	Private Bob Butler	
1988	Case Closed	Curtis Block	TV movie
1988	The Dead Pool	Embarcadero Bodyguard #2	
1989	Arena	Rogor	
1989	Tango & Cash	Lopez	
1990	Total Recall	Captain Everett	
1992	Quicksand: No Escape	Lieutenant Harold Towers	TV movie
1992	Rosemary	Unknown	TV movie
1992	Overkill: The Aileen Wuornos Story	Sheriff Walton	TV movie
1993	Rio Diablo	Jud Everly	TV movie
1993	Donato and Daughter	Detective Petsky	TV movie
1994	Naked Gun 33 1/3: The Final Insult	Trucker	
1994	The Fence	Rudy Baralli	
2020	Grizzly II: Revenge	Luke	filmed in 1983

=== Television ===
Year	Title	Role	Notes
1971	You Are There	Militia Man / Pony Express Rider	Episode: "The Record Ride for the Pony Express"
1971–1972	The Doctors	Frank Barton	51 episodes
1972–1973	Somerset	Virgil Paris	
1974	Apple's Way	Worthington	Episode: "The Witness"
1974	Toma		Episode: "Indictment"
1974	The Rockford Files	Farber	Episode: "The Dark and Bloody Ground"
1974	Gunsmoke	Kane	Episode: "The Iron Men"
1974	Get Christie Love!	Lucas	Episode: "Bullet from the Grave"
1975	Barnaby Jones	Dr. Whitehall	Episode: "Counterfall"
1975	Matt Helm	Devlin	Episode: "Matt Helm"
1975	The Wide World of Mystery	Byron	Episode: "Mr. & Mrs. and the Bandstand Mystery"
1976	Joe Forrester	Hawk	Episode: "Squeeze Play"
1976	Helter Skelter	Phil Cohen	2 episodes
1976	Mary Hartman, Mary Hartman	George Curtis	2 episodes
1974–1976	Police Story	John Scalesi / Gillette / Barbarosa / Officer Baker	5 episodes
1975–1976	The Blue Knight	Detective Akers / The Dutchman	2 episodes
1975–1976	Baretta	Carew / Slit	2 episodes
1977	Hunter	Lawson	Episode: "The Hit"
1977	The Hardy Boys/Nancy Drew Mysteries	Masked Man	Episode: "Mystery of the Solid Gold Kicker"
1977	Kingston: Confidential	Honky Henderson	Episode: "The Rage at Hannibal"
1977	The Six Million Dollar Man	Williams	2 episodes
1977	The Bionic Woman	Hopper	Episode: "African Connection"
1978	The American Girls	Charlie Kramer	Episode: "Firefly"
1973–1978	Kojak	Joe Greensteen / Artie	2 episodes
1975–1978	Starsky and Hutch	Daimler / 'Skinny' Momo / Eddie Moore	3 episodes
1979	Kaz	Ping Pong	Episode: "A Piece of Cake"
1979	Wonder Woman	Pierce	2 episodes
1979	B.J. and the Bear	Randy / Hammer's Accomplice	2 episodes
1980	Charlie's Angels	John Mackey	Episode: "One of Our Angels Is Missing"
1980	Quincy M.E.	Ed Burly	Episode: "Riot"
1978–1980	The Incredible Hulk	Joe Lo Franco / Captain Holt / Ernie	3 episodes
1978–1981	CHiPs	Zager / Bix	2 episodes
1982	McClain's Law		Episode: "Takeover"
1982	The Greatest American Hero	Donnie Armus	Episode: "There's Just No Accounting..."
1982	The Phoenix	Preminger's Associate	Episode: "In Search of Mira"
1982	Knight Rider	Bill Gordon	Episode: "Slammin' Sammy's Stunt Show Spectacular"
1983	The Renegades	Manton	Episode: "The Big Time"
1984	The Master	Straker	Episode: "Failure to Communicate"
1984	Jessie	Fletch	Episode: "Flesh Wounds"
1984	Hardcastle and McCormick	Captain Jerold D. Medwick	Episode: "One of the Girls from Accounting"
1984	The New Mike Hammer	Claude Fawner	Episode: "Cold Target"
1985	Hunter	Officer Doug Kirkwood	Episode: "The Shooter"
1985	Street Hawk	Phillip Truman	Episode: "Female of the Species"
1985	Our Family Honor	Dom	2 episodes
1983–1986	The Fall Guy	Bobby Lee / Max	2 episodes
1983–1986	T. J. Hooker	Manny Jacobs / Ray Downing	2 episodes
1987	Scarecrow and Mrs. King	Fritz Frommer	Episode: "Bad Timing"
1987	The A-Team	Angelo	Episode: "Without Reservations"
1987	Hill Street Blues	Gene Scapizzi	8 episodes
1987	21 Jump Street	Shields	Episode: "Fear and Loathing with Russell Buckins"
1984–1988	Cagney & Lacey	Det. Mahoney / Ernie Cade	2 episodes
1989	Freddy's Nightmares	Woody Burton	Episode: "Bloodlines"
1989	Paradise	Sheriff Fry	Episode: "The Return of Johnny Ryan"
1990	Nasty Boys	Major Clemens	Episode: "Last Tango in Vegas"
1990	Quantum Leap	Police Captain Paul Brewster	Episode: "Black on White on Fire"
1987–1992	Star Trek: The Next Generation	Frederick LaRouque / Gul Macet / Cmdr. Tebok / Badar N'D'D	4 episodes
1996	Diagnosis Murder	Mr. Smith	Episode: "Murder in the Dark"
1995–1998	Walker, Texas Ranger	Paul Kelton / Lamar	2 episodes
1993–1999	Star Trek: Deep Space Nine	Gul Dukat / Officer Ryan	35 episodes
2010	Family Guy	Dean of the Secret Order of Dirty Joke Writers	Episode: "The Splendid Source"

=== Video games ===
Year	Title	Role	Notes
1996	Santa Fe Mysteries: The Elk Moon Murder	Chief Gus Weber	Credited as Mark Alaimo
1997	Santa Fe Mysteries: Sacred Ground	Chief Gus Weber	Credited as Mark Alaimo
2001	Star Trek: Deep Space Nine: Dominion Wars	Gul Dukat	
2006	Call of Juarez	Reverend Ray	
2009	Call of Juarez: Bound in Blood	Ray McCall	Uncredited
