= Exhibition shooting =

Performing feats of skill

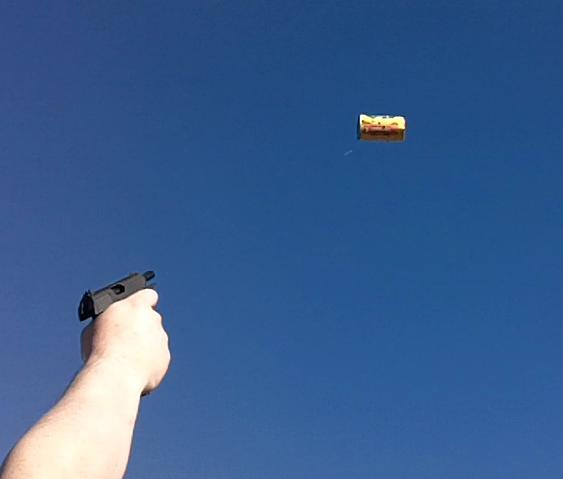
Shooting at a hand-thrown aerial target with a BB pistol; the slow moving BB is visible in the bright sunlight.

Exhibition shooting or trick shooting is a sport in which a marksman performs various feats of skill, frequently using non-traditional targets. Exhibition shooting tends to stress both speed and accuracy, often with elements of danger added.

== Famous shooters ==
=== Annie Oakley ===
With the advent of rifling came accurate firearms, and many exhibition shooters turned to these, forming the beginnings of western exhibition shooting. The most famous exhibition shooter is Annie Oakley, who toured with Buffalo Bill's Wild West show. While she could shoot well with handguns, rifles, and shotguns, Oakley's preferred firearm was a .22 caliber rifle. Standard tricks of Oakley's included:

- Cutting a playing card in half with a rifle bullet at long ranges
- Shooting cigarettes in half while they were held by volunteers
- Shooting a dime tossed in the air, at range of 90 feet
- Shooting long strings of targets tossed in the air; in one instance she hit 4472 out of 5000 in a single day.

=== Fabulous Topperweins ===
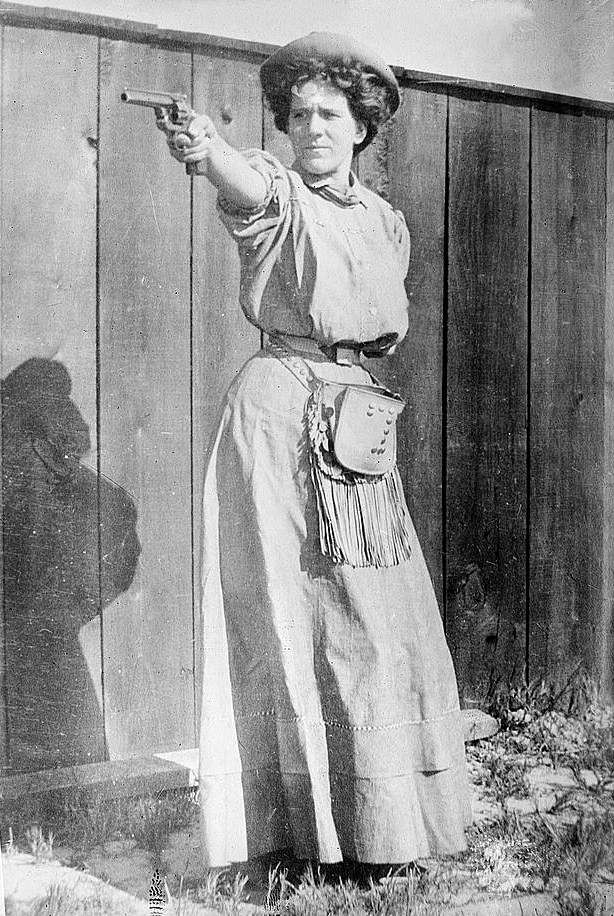
Elizabeth Topperwein, with gun circa 1911

The Fabulous Topperweins, a husband and wife pair, were exhibition shooters in the early to mid-20th century. Adolf, or "Ad", began shooting as a boy, and held many positions as a professional exhibition shooter. When he married his wife, Elizabeth, later known as "Plinky", she began to shoot, and soon eclipsed her husband's not inconsiderable skills. Together, they worked as professional shooters for Winchester for over 40 years. Common tricks were Plinky shooting cigarettes out of Ad's mouth, or shooting buttons off of his vest. Ad's closing act was to draw an Indian's head on a board with bullet holes. Both Topperweins held aerial shooting records, with Ad shooting at more than 72,000 hand-thrown blocks 2 1/2 inches in diameter, and missing only nine—his longest run without a miss was 14,540. Plinky's record, the first recorded for a woman shooting aerial targets, consisted of hitting 967 of 1,000 clay targets with a .22 Semi-automatic rifle. Plinky was also the first woman to shoot in the Grand American trap shooting tournament, and she shot 100 straight targets over 200 times in her career, and 200 straight targets 14 times.

=== Ed McGivern ===
Ed McGivern was an exhibition shooter and firearms trainer who specialized in the revolver. He still holds a number of speed shooting records (a number of which have been challenged, and some broken, by modern IPSC champion Jerry Miculek, Jr.) and was known for shooting aerial targets. Common tricks included:

- Throwing a tin can in the air, and firing six shots through it before it hit the ground
- Throwing a dime into the air and shooting it
- He hit cardboard discs and 1" lead discs on the edge that were thrown in the air

=== Jerry Miculek, Jr ===
Jerry Miculek, Jr. is an American professional speed and competition shooter who holds five officially sanctioned world records in revolver shooting and over 15 unsanctioned records with firearms ranging from rapid firing pistols to the Barrett M107 .50 BMG rifle.

=== Tom Frye ===
In 1959, champion Tom Frye of Remington Arms Company broke Ad Topperwein's aerial shooting record for shooting 2 1/4-inch cubes of wood thrown into the air. He managed to hit 100,004 of the 100,010 wooden blocks - using several Remington Nylon 66 semi-automatic .22 Long Rifle rifles - over a period of 14 straight days. However, although the same size of target was used, the comparison to Topperwein's record is disputed because of the test conditions. Firstly the shooting was undertaken in distances less than the regulation 30 ft (9.1 m). Secondly Frye's thrower tossed the target blocks over his shoulder along the line of sight of the gun. In contrast Topperwein's thrower stood beyond the regulation distance, tossing the blocks vertically into the air. In 1963, he had a run of 800 straight clay singles in trap shooting.

=== John Huffer ===
In 1987, at the age of 50, John "Chief AJ" Huffer shot 40,060 consecutive 2 1/2-inch-square pine blocks over a period of 8 days without a single miss, shooting blocks he himself tossed into the air, for 14 hours a day. Huffer accomplished this using 18 .22 Long Rifle Ruger 10/22 rifles, which he cycled through as assistants loaded them for him. Huffer also markets a special "Chief AJ" branded Daisy BB gun, based on a modified model Huffer uses for daily practice, and an instruction manual and video for his style of point shooting.

In 2008, at the age of 70, Huffer set a Guinness World Record for slingshot shooting, hitting 1,500 flying targets.

=== Herb Parsons ===
On a day of ordinary light, don't shoot until you can see the duck's eyes...

Herb Parsons (1908–1959) of Somerville, Tennessee, was Winchester's "Showman Shooter" for 30 years and was Adolph Topperwein's protégé and successor. His impressive list of honors includes: All-American Trap and Skeet Shooter; twice National and twice International Duck Calling Champion; and inductee to Trapshooting Hall of Fame, Cody Firearms Museum and Tennessee Sports Hall of Fame. His signature feat was throwing by hand and individually breaking seven clay targets with a Winchester Model 12, 12 gauge pump action shotgun. Able to eject and shoot the hulls of a Model 61, .22 pump rifle, Herb was the behind-the-camera shot maker and technical adviser for James Stewart's 1950 movie Winchester '73. Parsons was mentioned by Dr. Mallard in the NCIS episode "Ships in the Night", but Leroy Jethro Gibbs doesn't know who he is.

Take the last (duck in a group) to begin with...By taking the last one, you keep the swing right on through. If you nailed the first one, you'd have to come back with your muzzle and start a new swing. For your second shot, take the next to the last and the lowest duck. If you get those, don't worry. No one is going to get much better than a double.

=== Bob & Becky Munden ===
Both born in 1942. Bob was dubbed by the Guinness Book of World Records as “the fastest man with a gun who ever lived". The pair first performed together at a fair in California in 1968 and started touring full-time in 1969, presenting shooting demonstrations at schools and teaching gun safety. With his distinctive style of showmanship, Bob performed accuracy and speed demonstrations using handguns, rifles and shotguns. Becky was also champion shooter in her own right.

=== D. A. Bryce ===
D. A. Bryce, known as "Delf" or "Jelly", was born December 6, 1906, near Mountain View, in Oklahoma Territory. Bryce served as an officer first with the Oklahoma City police department, then the Oklahoma State Bureau of Investigation and later the Federal Bureau of Investigation. Bryce was also a skilled target shooter, and a fast draw expert. One of the tricks he used to demonstrate his speed was to hold a coin at shoulder height, drop it, then draw his revolver and shoot the coin by the time it reached waist height. This feat inspired an article in Life that included stroboscopic photographs of Bryce performing the draw.

=== Tom Knapp ===
Tom Knapp traveled the world for CZ-USA, Benelli and the Federal Premium Ammunition Company. He performed throughout Europe and the Mid-East. Knapp performed for the public starting in 1987 and holds three distinctive World Records in 'Freestyle Target Shooting' or 'Exhibition Shooting'. He died April 26, 2013.

== See also ==
- Shooting sports
- Horse archery
- Impalement arts
- Knife throwing
- Fanning (firearms): fanning, slip hammering, slip gun, thumbing
- Marksman
- Sniper
