= Parallax mapping =

Texture mapping technique

Parallax mapping with shadows

Parallax mapping (also called offset mapping or virtual displacement mapping) is an enhancement of the bump mapping or normal mapping techniques applied to textures in 3D rendering applications such as video games. To the end user, this means that textures such as stone walls will have more apparent depth and thus greater realism with less of an influence on the performance of the simulation. Parallax mapping was introduced by Tomomichi Kaneko et al., in 2001.

Parallax mapping is essentially a method by which rough or uneven surfaces on a 2D texture can be "pulled out" to take on the appearance of a 3D surface. Technically, this is implemented by displacing the texture coordinates at a point on the rendered polygon by a function of the view angle in tangent space (the angle relative to the surface normal) and the value of the height map at that point. At steeper view-angles, the texture coordinates are displaced more, giving the illusion of depth due to parallax effects as the view changes. This effect is commonly used for rendering windows in order to fake 3D interiors for example.

Parallax mapping, as described by Kaneko et al., is a single step process that does not account for occlusion. Subsequent enhancements have been made to the algorithm incorporating iterative approaches to allow for occlusion and accurate silhouette rendering.

== Steep parallax mapping ==
Steep parallax mapping is one name for the class of algorithms that trace rays against heightfields. The idea is to walk along a ray that has entered the heightfield's volume, finding the intersection point of the ray with the heightfield. This closest intersection is what part of the heightfield is truly visible. Relief mapping and parallax occlusion mapping are other common names for these techniques.

Interval mapping improves on the usual binary search done in relief mapping by creating a line between known inside and outside points and choosing the next sample point by intersecting this line with a ray, rather than using the midpoint as in a traditional binary search. Other variants include cone step mapping, which uses precomputed cone maps to accelerate ray-height-field intersection, and relaxed cone stepping, which follows cone-based space leaping with binary-search refinement.

== See also ==
- Parallax scrolling
