= A-buffer =

In computer graphics, A-buffer, also known as anti-aliased, area-averaged or accumulation buffer, is a general hidden surface mechanism suited to medium scale virtual memory computers. It resolves visibility among an arbitrary collection of opaque, transparent, and intersecting objects. Using an easy to compute Fourier window (box filter), it increases the effective image resolution many times over the Z-buffer, with a moderate increase in cost.

The A-buffer method is a descendant of the well known Z-buffer, which provides good quality results in moderate time.

== Uses ==
In 3D image synthesis system, the balance between the quality and the cost of computation has always been needed. Using a full object-precision visible-surface algorithm at each pixel is expensive. A-buffer method provides moderate quality results in moderate cost of computation.

A-buffer helps in using visibility techniques and supports all conceivable geometric modeling primitives: polygons, patches, quadrics, fractals, and so forth. It also helps to handle transparency and intersecting surfaces (and transparent intersecting surfaces). A-buffer-style methods have also been used for exact order-independent transparency on GPUs, where a pixel's fragments are captured in variable-length per-pixel structures, commonly linked lists, and then depth-sorted and composited in a later step.

== Strategy ==
Carpenter's A-buffer algorithm addresses this problem by approximating Catmull's per-pixel object-precision area sampling with per-pixel image-precision operation performed on a sub-pixel grid. In Carpenter's REYES implementation, polygons were generated in approximate scan-line order, but scan-line order was not required by the A-buffer itself. Polygons are first processed in scan-line order by clipping them to each square pixel they cover. This results in list of clipped polygon fragments corresponding to each square pixel. In A-buffer methods, these fragments are stored in variable-length per-pixel lists rather than only the nearest visible fragment, although Carpenter's original implementation stored a resolved color directly for a simple fully covered pixel and used a pointer to a front-to-back fragment list for a complex pixel. Each fragment has 4 by 8 bit mask of parts of the pixel it covers.

The bit-mask for a fragment is computed by xoring together masks representing each of the fragment's edges. When all polygons intersecting a pixel have been processed, the area-weighted average of the colors of the pixel's visible surfaces is obtained by selecting fragments in depth-sorted order and using their bit masks to clip those of farther fragments.

The bit masks can be manipulated efficiently with Boolean operations. For example, two fragment bit masks can be added together to determine the overlap between them. The A-buffer algorithm saves only a small amount of additional information with each fragment. For example. It includes the fragment's z extent, but no information about which part of the fragment is associated with these z values. Thus, the algorithm must make assumptions about the sub-pixel geometry in cases in which fragment bit masks overlap in z.
