= Fanning (firearms) =

Revolver shooting technique

Fanning (also known as fan firing) is a revolver shooting technique in which the shooter uses one hand to hold the gun and pull the trigger, while using the other hand to cock back the hammer repeatedly in a slapping-like fashion without touching any other parts of the gun. This allows for the rapid firing of single-action revolvers, and the technique is used extensively in fast draw exhibitions.

Slip hammering is another similar revolver technique involving the use of one hand to pull the trigger and the other hand to repeatedly cock the hammer. The difference is that in slip hammering, both hands maintain grasp on the gun through an overwrapping grip, and only the thumb of the outside hand (typically the non-dominant hand) moves to flip back the hammer. This allows for quick shooting while maintaining a firmer control of the firearm than the fanning technique, but fatigues more easily as the muscles of the thumb are generally weaker and less staminous than the wrist muscles.

The idea (as spread by old western films) that gunslingers in the "Old West" fanned their revolvers in actual gunfights with any regularity is considered a caricature. It was done in shooting exhibitions (where trick marksmen entertained crowds with exotic shooting shows) and by many a curious target-practiser. It was probably not common in actual firefights, because it does not lend itself to most real-life tactical situations, accuracy, or the use of cover. One longtime firearms instructor, George L. Tooley, said: "Fanning is hard on the revolver, in addition to being inaccurate, and is not recommended".

A slip gun is a revolver which has been modified to disconnect the trigger from the hammer, so as to cause it to fire by pulling back and releasing the hammer. Often the hammer spur is lowered, so the gun may be fired by wiping one's finger across the hammer. The only difference from fanning is that only one hand is needed, because in fanning one hand holds the gun and pulls back the trigger while the other hand knocks back the hammer repeatedly. Slip shooting is a little slower than fanning, but more accurate and practical since only one hand is needed. Slip guns were used for various types of rapid trick shooting in which the ability to instinctively rapid fire was crucial.

Thumbing has been used to refer to a similar action as fanning except instead of using the opposite hand to pull the hammer while the trigger is depressed, the thumb of the gun hand is used. This would be necessary if firing paired revolvers.

== Bibliography ==
- Tooley, George L. (2000), George Tooley's Beginner's Book on How to Handle Firearms Safely, Writers Club Press, imprint of iUniverse.com, ISBN 978-0-595-08873-7.
