= Parallax occlusion mapping =

Computer graphics method

Parallax occlusion mapping (POM) is an enhancement of the parallax mapping technique. Parallax occlusion mapping is used to procedurally create 3D definition in textured surfaces, using a displacement map (similar to a topography map) instead of through the generation of new geometry. This allows developers of 3D rendering applications to add 3D complexity in textures, which correctly change relative to perspective and with self occlusion in real time (self-shadowing is additionally possible), without sacrificing the processor cycles required to create the same effect with geometry calculations. Standard parallax occlusion mapping changes apparent interior surface detail but does not change the underlying mesh silhouette, and later work such as prism parallax occlusion mapping targeted accurate silhouette generation.

Parallax occlusion mapping was first published in 2005 by Zoe Brawley and Natalya Tatarchuk in ShaderX3. Natalya Tatarchuk conducted presentations of the technology at SIGGRAPH in 2005. It was used in ATI's 'Toy Shop Demo' to showcase the Radeon X1800's Ultra-Threaded SM 3.0 technology. It is used in video games and rendering engines such as Unigine, CryEngine 2, and CryEngine 3 and Unreal Engine 4. It has also been used to create stereoscopic images from single images.
