= VBO =

VBO may refer to:

- Vainu Bappu Observatory
- Vertex Buffer Object, an OpenGL extension for faster rendering of triangles
- Verbond van Belgische Ondernemingen, the Federation of Belgian Enterprises
