= Wrapping (graphics) =

In computer graphics, wrapping is the process of limiting a position to an area. A good example of wrapping is wallpaper, a single pattern repeated indefinitely over a wall. Wrapping is used in 3D computer graphics to repeat a texture over a polygon, eliminating the need for large textures or multiple polygons.

To wrap a position x to an area of width w, calculate the value $x' = x \text{ mod } w$.

== Implementation ==
For computational purposes the wrapped value x' of x can be expressed as

$$x' = x - \lfloor (x - x_{\text{min}}) / (x_{\text{max}} - x_{\text{min}}) \rfloor \cdot (x_{\text{max}} - x_{\text{min}})$$

where $x_{\text{max}}$ is the highest value in the range, and $x_{\text{min}}$ is the lowest value in the range.

Pseudocode for wrapping of a value to a range other than 0–1 is

function wrap(X, Min, Max: Real): Real;
    X := X - Int((X - Min) / (Max - Min)) * (Max - Min);
    if X < 0 then // This corrects the problem caused by using Int instead of Floor
        X := X + Max - Min;
    return X;

Pseudocode for wrapping of a value to a range of 0–1 is

function wrap(X: Real): Real;
    X := X - Int(X);
    if X < 0 then
        X := X + 1;
    return X;

Pseudocode for wrapping of a value to a range of 0–1 without branching is,

function wrap(X: Real): Real;
    return ((X mod 1.0) + 1.0) mod 1.0;

== See also ==
- Text wrapping
- Clamping (function)
