= Blend modes =

How two or more digital photo layers are mixed together

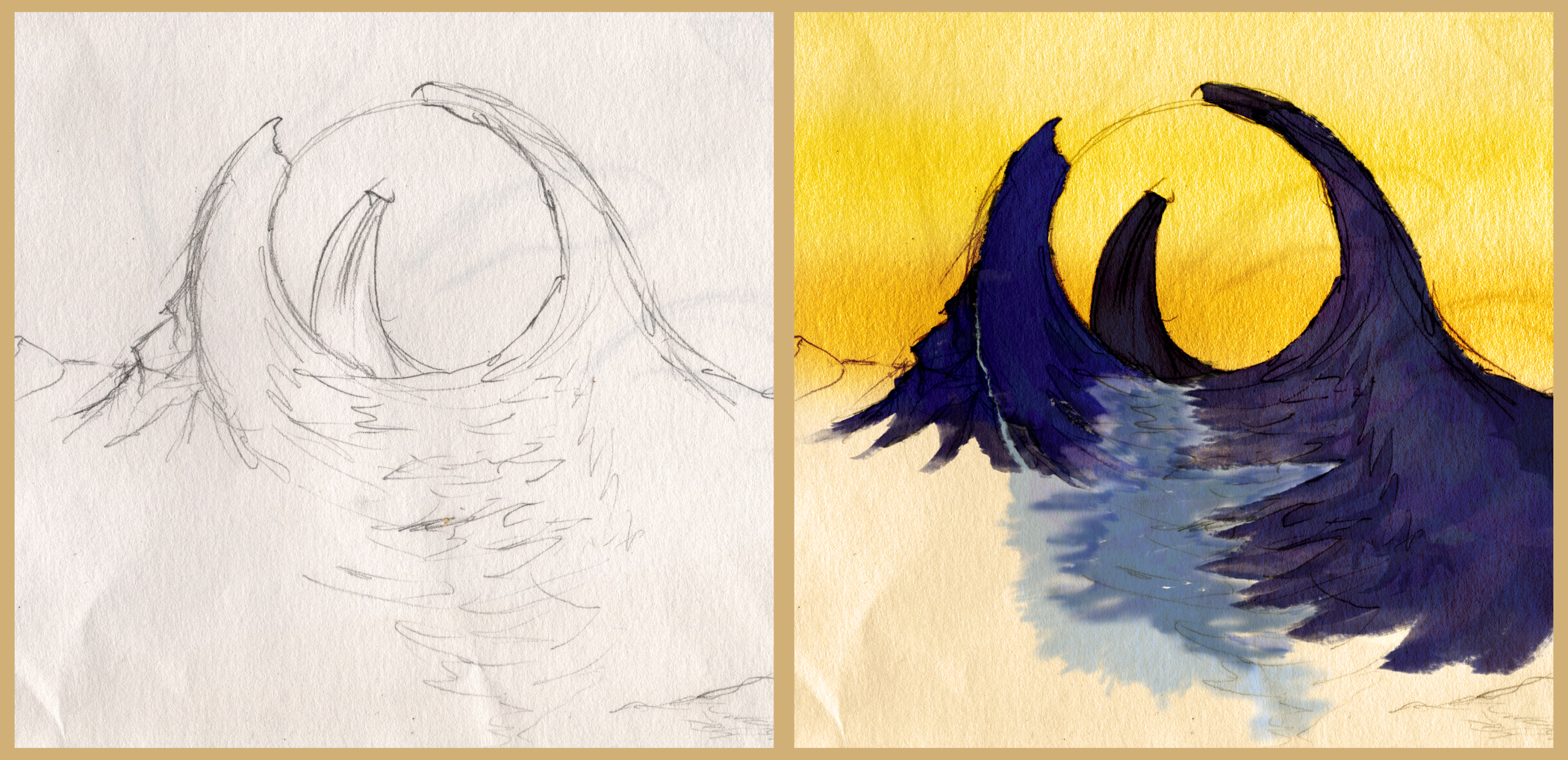
A sketch colored digitally with use of several different blend modes in order to preserve the pencil lines and paper texture below the color layers.

Blend modes (alternatively blending modes or mixing modes) in digital image editing and computer graphics are used to determine how two layers are blended with each other. The default blend mode in most applications is simply to obscure the lower layer by covering it with whatever is present in the top layer (see alpha compositing); because each pixel has numerical values, there also are many other ways to blend two layers.

Most graphics editing programs, such as Adobe Photoshop and GIMP, allow users to modify the basic blend modes, for example by applying different levels of opacity to the top "layer". The top "layer" is not necessarily a layer in the application; it may be applied with a painting or editing tool. The top "layer" also is called the "blend layer" and the "active layer".

In the formulas shown on this page, values go from 0.0 (black) to 1.0 (white).

== Normal blend mode ==
This is the standard blend mode which uses the top layer alone, without mixing its colors with the layer beneath it:

$$f(a, b) = b$$

where a is the value of a color channel in the underlying layer, and b is that of the corresponding channel of the upper layer. The result is most typically merged into the bottom layer using "simple" (b over a) alpha compositing (making the actual formula $f(a, b) = \operatorname{alpha}(b, a)$), but other Porter-Duff operations are possible. The compositing step results in the top layer's shape, as defined by its alpha channel, appearing over the bottom layer.

== Dissolve ==
The dissolve mode takes random pixels from both layers. With top layer opacity greater than that of the bottom layer, most pixels are taken from the top layer, while with low opacity most pixels are taken from the bottom layer. No anti-aliasing is used with this blend mode, so the pictures may look grainy and harsh.

Adobe Photoshop generates a pseudo-random noise dither pattern on startup, with each pixel location in a 2D raster array assigned a gray value (R=G=B) and an alpha value of 1 ("on"). As the opacity of the top layer is reduced, the alpha value of some of the gray pixels is switched from 1 to 0 ("off"), with the result that image pixels corresponding to a gray-valued pixel in the raster array are either on (visible, opaque) or off (invisible, transparent), with no opacity gradation.

== Multiply and Screen ==
Multiply and Screen blend modes are basic blend modes for darkening and lightening images, respectively. There are many combinations of them, such as Overlay, Soft Light (see below), Vivid Light, Linear Light, and Pin Light.

=== Multiply ===
Multiply blend mode takes the RGB channel values from 0 to 1 of each pixel in the top layer and multiplies them with the values for the corresponding pixel from the bottom layer. The composite is darker, unless the pixel is white in either layer or black in both layers. Where either layer is white, the composite is the same as the other layer. Where both layers are black, the composite is the same.

$$f(a,b) = ab,$$

where a is the base layer value and b is the top layer value.

This mode is commutative: exchanging two layers does not change the result. If the two layers contain the same picture, multiply blend mode is equivalent to a quadratic curve, or gamma correction with γ=2. For image editing it is sometimes more convenient to simply go to the Curves dialog of the software, because it gives more flexibility in the shape of the curves. Or one can use Levels dialog: the middle number is usually 1/γ, so one can just type 0.5.

If one layer contains a homogeneous color, such as the gray color (0.8, 0.8, 0.8), multiply blend mode is equivalent to a curve that is simply a straight line. This is also equivalent to using this gray value as opacity when doing "normal mode" blend with a black bottom layer.

=== Screen ===
With Screen blend mode, the values of the pixels in the two layers are inverted, multiplied, and then inverted again. The result is the opposite of Multiply: wherever either layer was darker than white, the composite is brighter.

$$f(a,b) = 1 - (1 - a)(1 - b),$$

where a is the base layer value and b is the top layer value.

This mode is commutative: exchanging two layers does not change the result. If one layer contains a homogeneous gray, Screen blend mode is equivalent to using this gray value as opacity when doing "normal mode" blend with white top layer.

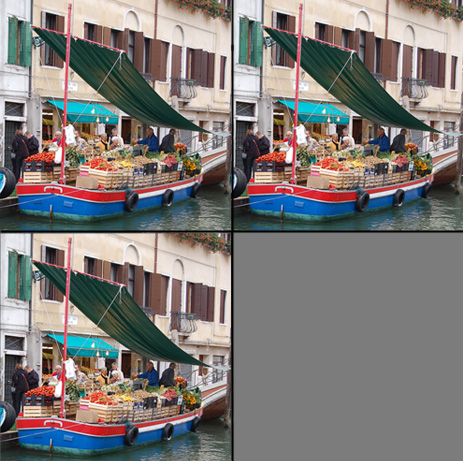
Example top layer

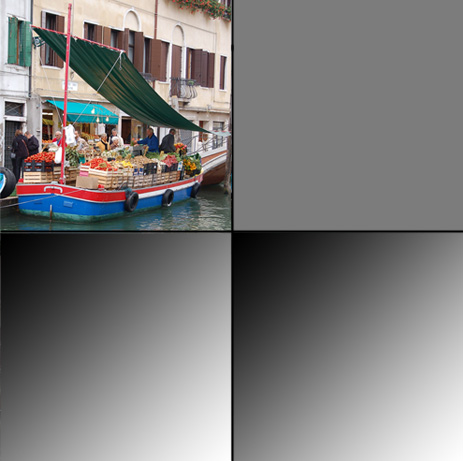
Example bottom layer

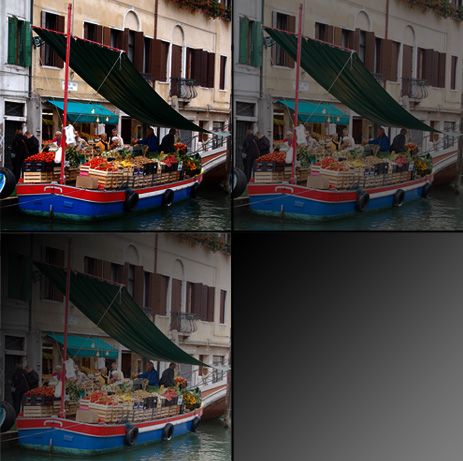
Multiply blend mode applied to the two example layers

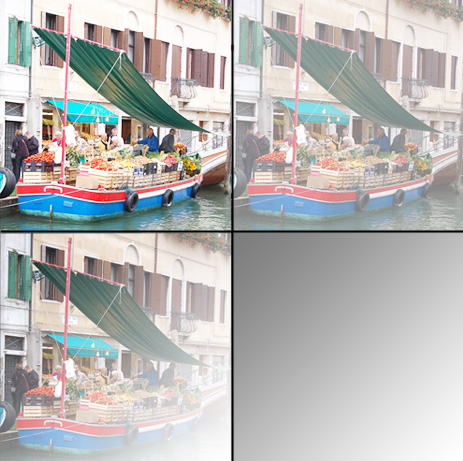
Screen blend mode applied to the two example layers

=== Overlay ===
Overlay combines Multiply and Screen blend modes. Where the base layer is light, the top layer becomes lighter; where the base layer is dark, the top becomes darker; where the base layer is mid grey, the top is unaffected. An overlay with the same picture looks like an S-curve.

$$f(a,b) =
\begin{cases}
2 a b,           &\mbox{if } a < 0.5 \\
1 - 2 ( 1 - a ) ( 1 - b ), &\mbox{otherwise}
\end{cases}$$

where a is the base layer value and b is the top layer value.

When $a < 0.5$ one gets linear interpolation between 0 and $2a$; when $a \ge 0.5$ one gets linear interpolation between $2a-1$ and 1. This mode is not commutative. However, it can be made commutative by changing the $a < 0.5$ condition to be either $\min(a, b) < 0.5$ or $\max(a, b) < 0.5$.

=== Hard Light ===
Hard Light is also a combination of Multiply and Screen. Hard Light affects the blend layer's relationship to the base layer in the same way Overlay affects the base layer's relationship to the blend layer.

$$f(a,b) =
\begin{cases}
2 a b,           &\mbox{if } b < 0.5 \\
1 - 2 ( 1 - a ) ( 1 - b ), &\mbox{otherwise}
\end{cases}$$

The inverse relationship between Overlay and Hard Light makes them "commuted blend modes".

=== Soft Light ===
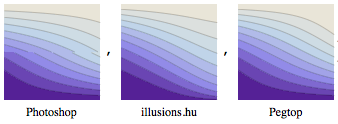
Comparison of soft light blend modes

Soft light is most closely related to Overlay and is only similar to Hard Light by name. Applying pure black or white does not result in pure black or white.

There are a variety of different methods of applying a soft light blend. All the flavors produce the same result when the top layer is pure black; same for when the top layer is pure neutral gray. The Photoshop and illusions.hu flavors also produce the same result when the top layer is pure white (the differences between these two are in how one interpolates between these 3 results).

These three results coincide with gamma correction of the bottom layer with γ=2 (for top black), unchanged bottom layer (or, what is the same, γ=1; for top neutral gray), and γ=0.5 (for top white).

The formula used by Photoshop as of 2012 has a discontinuity of local contrast, and other formulas correct it. Photoshop's formula is:

$$f_{\mathrm{photoshop}}(a,b) =
\begin{cases}
2 a b + a^2 (1 - 2 b),           &\mbox{if } b < 0.5 \\
2 a (1 - b) + \sqrt{a} (2 b - 1), &\mbox{otherwise}
\end{cases}$$

where a is the base layer value and b is the top layer value. Depending on b, one gets a linear interpolation between three gamma corrections: γ=2 (for b=0), γ=1 (for b=0.5), and γ=0.5 (for b=1).

Pegtop's formula is smoother and corrects the discontinuity at b = 0.5:

$$f_{\mathrm{pegtop}}(a,b) = (1-2b)a^2 + 2ba.$$

This is a linear interpolation between Multiply (for a=0) and Screen (for a=1) blend modes. It can also be seen as a linear interpolation between the gamma correction with γ=2 (for b=0), and a certain tonal curve (for b=1). (The latter curve is equivalent to applying γ=2 to the negative of image.)

A third formula defined by illusions.hu corrects the discontinuity in a different way, doing gamma correction with γ depending on b:

$$f_{\mathrm{illusions.hu}}(a, b) = a^{( 2^{2(0.5 - b)} )}$$

For b=0, one still gets γ=2, for b=0.5 one gets γ=1, for b=1 one gets γ=0.5, but it is not a linear interpolation between these 3 images.

The formula specified by recent W3C drafts for SVG and Canvas is mathematically equivalent to the Photoshop formula with a small variation where b≤0.5 and a≤0.25:

$$f_{\mathrm{w3c}}(a, b) =
\begin{cases}
a - (1 - 2 b) \cdot a \cdot (1 - a)
& \text{if } b \leq 0.5 \\
a + (2 b - 1) \cdot (g_{w3c}(a) - a)
& \text{otherwise}
\end{cases}$$

where:

$$g_{\mathrm{w3c}}(a) =
\begin{cases}
((16 a - 12) \cdot a + 4) \cdot a
& \text{if } a \leq 0.25 \\
\sqrt{a}
& \text{otherwise}
\end{cases}.$$

This is also the formula used by Cairo, and in earlier PDF documentation.

It is still a linear interpolation between 3 images for b=0, 0.5, 1. But now the image for b=1 is not γ=0.5, but the result of a tonal curve which differs from the curve of γ=0.5 for small values of a: while gamma correction with γ=0.5 may increase the value of a many times, this new curve limits the increase of a by coefficient 4.

== Dodge and burn ==
Dodge and burn change the lightness of the pictures, inspired by the dodging and burning performed in a darkroom. Dodging lightens an image, while burning darkens it. Dodging the image is the same as burning its negative (and vice versa).

- Dodge modes:
  - The Screen blend mode inverts both layers, multiplies them, and then inverts that result.
  - The Color Dodge blend mode divides the bottom layer by the inverted top layer. This lightens the bottom layer depending on the value of the top layer: the brighter the top layer, the more its color affects the bottom layer. Blending any color with white gives white. Blending with black does not change the image. The operation is not invertible due to possible clipping of highlights. (The clipping happens in the same area as for the Linear Dodge.) When the top layer contains a homogeneous color, this effect is equivalent to changing the white point to the inverted color. The perceived contrast increases when there is no clipping.
  - The Linear Dodge blend mode simply sums the values in the two layers (also known as additive blending). Blending with white gives white. Blending with black does not change the image. When the top layer contains a homogeneous color, this effect is equivalent to changing the output black point to this color, and (input) white point to the inverted color. The contrast is decreased when there is no clipping.
  - Divide: Same as "Color Dodge", but blending with white does not change the image.
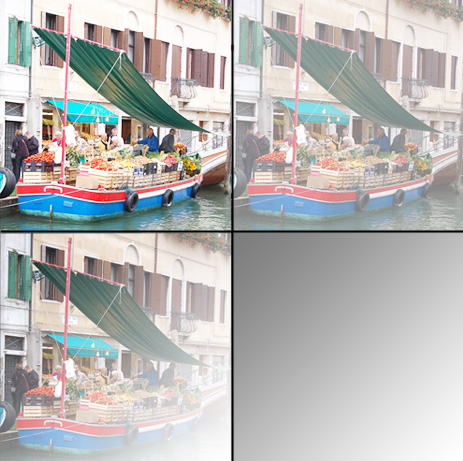
Screen blend mode applied to the example pictures

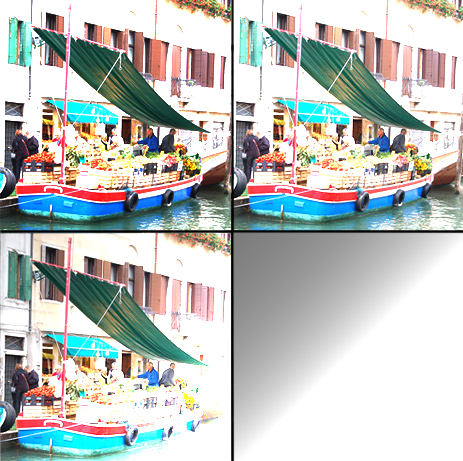
Color Dodge blend mode applied to the example pictures

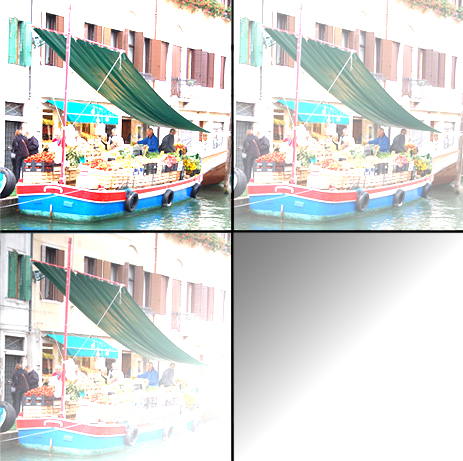
Linear Dodge (Additive) blend mode applied to the example pictures
- Burn modes:
  - The Multiply mode simply multiplies each component in the two layers.
  - The Color Burn mode divides the inverted bottom layer by the top layer, and then inverts the result. This darkens the top layer increasing the contrast to reflect the color of the bottom layer. The darker the bottom layer, the more its color is used. Blending with white produces no difference. When the top layer contains a homogeneous color, this effect is equivalent to changing the black point to the inverted color. The operation is not invertible due to possible clipping of shadows. The clipping happens in the same area as for the Linear Burn.
  - The Linear Burn mode sums the value in the two layers and subtracts 1. This is the same as inverting each layer, adding them together (as in Linear Dodge), and then inverting the result. Blending with white leaves the image unchanged.
- Vivid Light: this blend mode combines Color Dodge and Color Burn (rescaled so that neutral colors become middle gray). Dodge applies when values in the top layer are lighter than middle gray, and burn applies to darker values. The middle gray is the neutral color. When the top layer's color is lighter than this, this effectively moves the white point of the bottom layer down by twice the difference; when it is darker, the black point is moved up by twice the difference. (This increases the perceived contrast.)
- Linear Light: this blend mode combines Linear Dodge and Linear Burn (rescaled so that neutral colors become middle gray). Dodge is applied when the value on the top layer is lighter than middle gray, and burn applies when the top layer value is darker. The calculation simplifies to the sum of the bottom layer and twice the top layer, subtract 1. This mode decreases the contrast.
- Subtract: this blend mode sums the value in the two layers and subtracts 1. Unlike Linear Burn, blending with white affects the image.

== Simple arithmetic blend modes ==
=== Divide ===
This blend mode divides the RGB channel values of bottom layer by those of the top layer: the darker the top layer, the brighter the bottom layer will appear. Blending any color with black yields white; blending with white has no effect. This operation is not invertible due to possible clipping of highlights.

When blended with a homogeneous color such as gray, this blend mode uniformly increases an image's contrast, especially its highlights. It can also sometimes be used to correct/remove a uniform color tint from an image (similar to adjusting the image's white point) by specifying the color tint itself as the value to divide by.

=== Addition ===
This blend mode simply adds pixel values of one layer with the other. In case of values above 1 (in the case of RGB), white is displayed. "Linear Dodge" produces the same visual result. Since this always produces the same or lighter colors than the input it is also known as 'plus lighter'. A variant subtracts 1 from all end values, with values below 0 becoming black; this mode is known as 'plus darker'.

=== Subtract ===
This blend mode simply subtracts pixel values of one layer with the other. In case of negative values, black is displayed. In some applications such as Krita, "Inverse Subtract" is also available.

=== Difference ===
Difference subtracts the bottom layer from the top layer and takes the absolute value of the result. As such, Difference never returns negative values. Blending with black produces no change, as values for all colors are 0. (The RGB value for black is (0,0,0).) Blending with white inverts the picture.

One of the main utilities for this is during the editing process, when it can be used to verify alignment of pictures with similar content. Exclusion is a very similar blend mode with lower contrast.

=== Darken Only ===
Darken Only creates a pixel that retains the smallest components of the foreground and background pixels. If the foreground pixel has the components $(r_1, g_1, b_1)$, and the background has $(r_2, g_2, b_2)$, the resultant pixel is:

$$[\min(r_1, r_2), \min(g_1, g_2), \min(b_1, b_2)]$$

=== Lighten Only ===
Lighten Only has the opposite action of Darken Only. It selects the maximum of each component from the foreground and background pixels. The mathematical expression for Lighten Only is:

$$[\max(r_1, r_2), \max(g_1, g_2), \max(b_1, b_2)]$$

== Boolean arithmetic blend modes ==
A few applications, such as Aviary's Peacock and KDE's Krita, supply boolean arithmetic blend modes. These combine the binary expansion of the hexadecimal color at each pixel of two layers using boolean logic gates. The top layer's alpha controls interpolation between the lower layer's image and the combined image.

== Hue, saturation, color and luminosity ==
Photoshop's hue, saturation, color, and luminosity blend modes are based on a color space with hue, chroma and luma dimensions. Note: this space is different from both HSL and HSV, and only the hue dimension is shared between the three. See the article HSL and HSV for details.

Unlike all of the previous blend modes described, which operate on each image channel independently, in each of these modes, some dimensions are taken from the bottom layer, while the remainder are taken from the top layer. Colors which end up out of gamut are brought inside by mapping along lines of constant hue and luma. This makes the operations uninvertible – after a top layer has been applied in one of these blend modes, it is in some cases impossible to restore the appearance of the original (bottom) layer, even by applying a copy of the bottom layer in the same blend mode above both.

- The Hue blend mode preserves the luma and chroma of the bottom layer, while adopting the hue of the top layer.
- The Saturation blend mode preserves the luma and hue of the bottom layer, while adopting the chroma of the top layer.
- The Color blend mode preserves the luma of the bottom layer, while adopting the hue and chroma of the top layer.
- The Luminosity blend mode preserves the hue and chroma of the bottom layer, while adopting the luma of the top layer.

Because these blend modes are based on a color space which is much closer than RGB to perceptually relevant dimensions, it can be used to correct the color of an image without altering perceived lightness, and to manipulate lightness contrast without changing the hue or chroma. The Luminosity mode is commonly used for image sharpening, because human vision is much more sensitive to fine-scale lightness contrast than color contrast. (See Contrast (vision))

Few editors other than Photoshop implement this same color space for their analogs of these blend modes. Instead, they typically base their blend modes on HSV (aka HSB) or HSL. Blend modes based on HSV are typically labeled hue, saturation, and brightness. Using HSL or HSV has the advantage that most operations become invertible (at least in theory), but the disadvantage that the dimensions of HSL and HSV are not as perceptually relevant as the dimensions of the space Photoshop uses.

== Relation to masking ==
The result of applying several of these modes depends linearly on the pixel level of the top layer. In such cases, when the top layer is purely black, one gets a certain transformation of the bottom layer (which may be just a purely black or purely white image). When the top layer is purely white, one gets another such transformation. The intermediate gray values are described above using the opacity slider on the second transformation.

In such cases, applying the blending mode is equivalent to Normal blending:

- Apply two transformations to the bottom layers;
- Use the result of the first transformation as the new bottom layer;
- Put the result of the second transformation as the new top layer;
- Use the initial top layer as the mask on the new top layer.

(This assumes that the mask may be colored, with its R, G, B channels masking the channels of the image independently. Many image manipulation programs do not allow such masks; for them this equivalence holds only for grayscale top layers.)

== Differences between layer and tool blending ==
Some applications allow the user to apply blending modes to painting tools, such as the Brush tool in Photoshop or any painting tools in GIMP. When blending modes are used with these tools, the result is calculated based on pixels already existing on the target layer. If no pixels currently exist, then the 'painted' pixels are created as if in Normal blending mode. Subsequent strokes that overlap are then calculated based on the tool's blending mode, and the result is applied directly to the layer. A key difference with tool blending versus layer blending is that the results of tool blends are generally not able to be adjusted after the stroke is made, with the exception of stepping backward with the application's Undo command; layer blends may be adjusted with opacity or even switched, as they are applied dynamically between layers. Put differently, painting tools alter the pixels on a layer; blend modes applied to two layers don't alter any pixels, but only affect the resulting visual image.

This distinction is useful to create various effects on a single layer, such as when applying dodge and burn techniques, where painting with a low opacity in screen or multiply modes allows the user to build up or reduce the results in a more organic way on a single layer.

== See also ==
- Alpha to coverage
- Comparison of raster graphics editors
- Raster graphics
- Digital image processing
