= Viewing frustum =

Region of space in the modeled world that may appear on the screen

A view frustum

The appearance of an object in a pyramid of vision

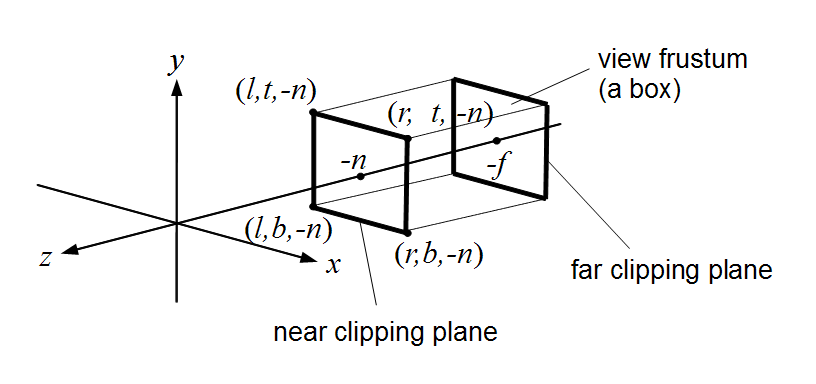
When creating a parallel projection, the viewing frustum is shaped like a box as opposed to a pyramid.

In 3D computer graphics, a viewing frustum or view frustum is the region of space in the modeled world that may appear on the screen; it is the field of view of a perspective virtual camera system.

The view frustum is typically obtained by taking a geometrical frustum—that is a truncation with parallel planes—of the pyramid of vision, which is the adaptation of (idealized) cone of vision that a camera or eye would have to the rectangular viewports typically used in computer graphics. Some authors use pyramid of vision as a synonym for view frustum itself, i.e. consider it truncated.

The exact shape of this region varies depending on what kind of camera lens is being simulated, but typically it is a frustum of a rectangular pyramid (hence the name). The planes that cut the frustum perpendicular to the viewing direction are called the near plane and the far plane. Objects closer to the camera than the near plane or beyond the far plane are not drawn. Sometimes, the far plane is placed infinitely far away from the camera so all objects within the frustum are drawn regardless of their distance from the camera.

Viewing-frustum culling is the process of removing from the rendering process those objects that lie completely outside the viewing frustum. Rendering these objects would be a waste of resources since they are not directly visible. To make culling fast, it is usually done using bounding volumes surrounding the objects rather than the objects themselves.

== Definitions ==
VPN
the view-plane normal – a normal to the view plane.

VUV
the view-up vector – the vector on the view plane that indicates the upward direction.

VRP
the viewing reference point – a point located on the view plane, and the origin of the VRC.

PRP
the projection reference point – the point where the image is projected from, for parallel projection, the PRP is at infinity.

VRC
the viewing-reference coordinate system.

The geometry is defined by a field of view angle (in the 'y' direction), as well as an aspect ratio. Further, a set of z-planes define the near and far bounds of the frustum. Together this information can be used to calculate a projection matrix for rendering transformation in a graphics pipeline.
