= Image and object order rendering =

In computer graphics, image order algorithms iterate over the pixels in the image to be produced, rather than the elements in the scene to be rendered. Object order algorithms are those that iterate over the elements in the scene to be rendered, rather than the pixels in the image to be produced. For typical rendering applications, the scene contains many fewer elements (e.g. geometric primitives) than image pixels. In those cases, object order algorithms are usually most efficient (e.g. scan conversion or shear warp). But when the scene complexity exceeds that of the image, such as is the case often in volume rendering, then image order algorithms (e.g., ray casting) may be more efficient. Some volume-rendering methods do not fit cleanly into either category; for example, shear-warp rendering traverses both the volume and an intermediate image to combine image-order and object-order advantages.
