= Channel (digital image) =

Color in digital images

Color digital images are made of pixels, and pixels are made of combinations of primary colors represented by a series of code. A channel in this context is the grayscale image of the same size as a color image, made of just one of these primary colors. For instance, an image from a standard digital camera will have a red, green and blue channel. A grayscale image has just one channel.

In geographic information systems, channels are often referred to as raster bands. Another closely related concept is feature maps, which are used in convolutional neural networks.

== Overview ==
In the digital realm, there can be any number of conventional primary colors making up an image; a channel in this case is extended to be the grayscale image based on any such conventional primary color. By extension, a channel is any grayscale image of the same dimension as and associated with the original image.

Channel is a conventional term used to refer to a certain component of an image. In reality, any image format can use any algorithm internally to store images. For instance, GIF images actually refer to the color in each pixel by an index number, which refers to a table where three color components are stored. However, regardless of how a specific format stores the images, discrete color channels can always be determined, as long as a final color image can be rendered.

The concept of channels is extended beyond the visible spectrum in multispectral and hyperspectral imaging. In that context, each channel corresponds to a range of wavelengths and contains spectroscopic information. The channels can have multiple widths and ranges.

Three main channel types (or color models) exist, and have respective strengths and weaknesses.

=== RGB images ===
An RGB image has three channels: red, green, and blue. RGB channels roughly follow the color receptors in the human eye, and are used in computer displays and image scanners.

If the RGB image is 24-bit (the industry standard as of 2005), each channel has 8 bits, for red, green, and blue—in other words, the image is composed of three images (one for each channel), where each image can store discrete pixels with conventional brightness intensities between 0 and 255. If the RGB image is 48-bit (very high color-depth), each channel has 16-bit per pixel color, that is 16-bit red, green, and blue for each per pixel.

==== RGB color sample ====
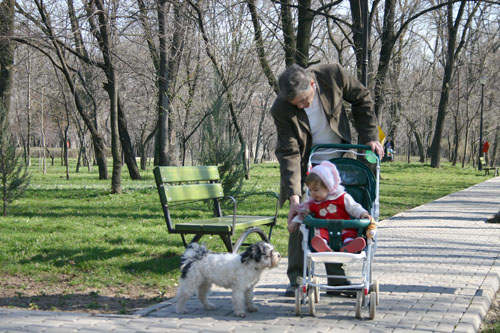
A 24-bit RGB image

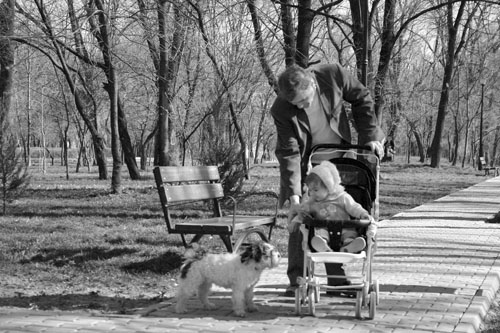
The red channel, displayed as grayscale

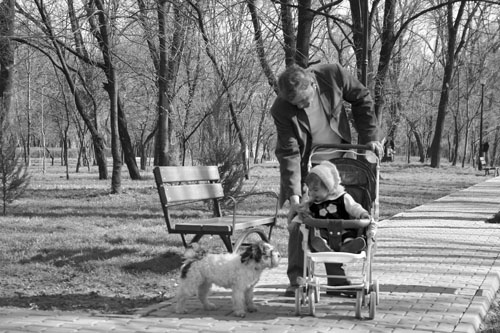
The green channel, displayed as grayscale

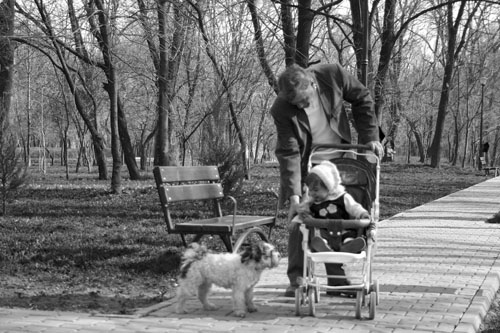
The blue channel, displayed as grayscale

Notice how the grey trees have similar brightness in all channels, the red dress is much brighter in the red channel than in the other two, and how the green part of the picture is shown much brighter in the green channel.

=== YUV ===
YUV images are an affine transformation of the RGB colorspace, originated in broadcasting. The Y channel correlates approximately with perceived intensity, whilst the U and V channels provide colour information.

=== CMYK ===
A CMYK image has four channels: cyan, magenta, yellow, and key (black). CMYK is the standard for print, where subtractive coloring is used.

A 32-bit CMYK image (the industry standard as of 2005) is made of four 8-bit channels, one for cyan, one for magenta, one for yellow, and one for key color (typically is black). 64-bit storage for CMYK images (16-bit per channel) is not common, since CMYK is usually device-dependent, whereas RGB is the generic standard for device-independent storage.

==== CMYK color sample ====
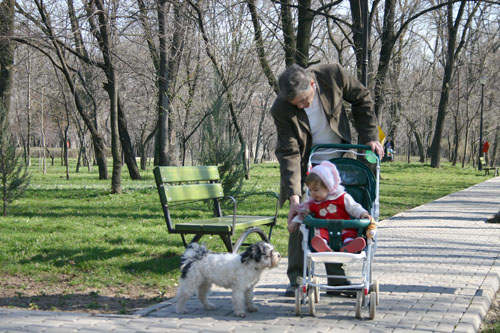
Example 32-bit CMYK image

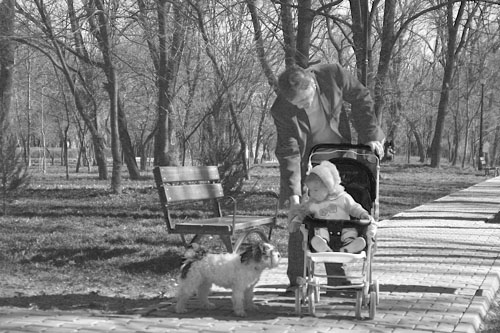
Cyan channel

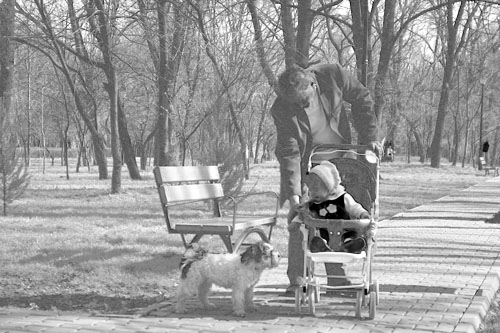
Magenta channel

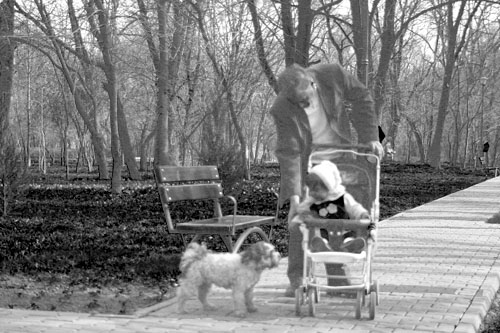
Yellow channel

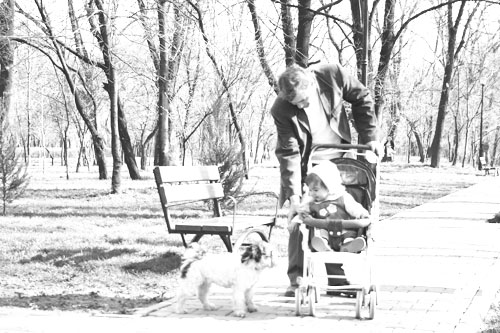
Key (black) channel

=== HSV ===
HSV, or hue saturation value, stores color information in three channels, just like RGB, but one channel is devoted to brightness (value), and the other two convey colour information. The value channel is similar to (but not exactly the same as) the CMYK black channel, or its negative.

HSV is especially useful in lossy video compression, where loss of color information is less noticeable to the human eye.

== Alpha channel ==
The alpha channel stores transparency information—the higher the value, the more opaque that pixel is. No camera or scanner measures transparency, although physical objects certainly can possess transparency, but the alpha channel is extremely useful for compositing digital images together.

Bluescreen technology involves filming actors in front of a primary color background, then setting that color to transparent, and compositing it with a background.

The GIF and PNG image formats use alpha channels on the World Wide Web to merge images on web pages so that they appear to have an arbitrary shape even on a non-uniform background.

== Other channels ==
In 3D computer graphics, multiple channels are used for additional control over material rendering; e.g., controlling specularity and so on.

== Bit depth ==
In digitizing images, the color channels are converted to numbers. Since images contain thousands of pixels, each with multiple channels, channels are usually encoded in as few bits as possible. Typical values are 8 bits per channel or 16 bits per channel. Indexed color effectively gets rid of channels altogether to get, for instance, 3 channels into 8 bits (GIF) or 16 bits.

== Optimized channel sizes ==
Since the brain does not necessarily perceive distinctions in each channel to the same degree as in other channels, it is possible that differing the number of bits allocated to each channel will result in more optimal storage; in particular, for RGB images, compressing the blue channel the most and the red channel the least may be better than giving equal space to each.

Among other techniques, lossy video compression uses chroma subsampling to reduce the bit depth in color channels (hue and saturation), while keeping all brightness information (value in HSV).

16-bit HiColor stores red and blue in 5 bits, and green in 6 bits.
