= SSDO =

SSDO can mean:

- screen space directional occlusion
- the former ICAO code for Dourados Airport
- in biology, the SSDO-clade
