= Philippe Bekaert =

Professor

Philippe Bekaert (1967 - 2022) was a professor in visual computing at the Expertise center for Digital Media (EDM) of Hasselt University, Belgium. His research areas include omnidirectional (360°) and free viewpoint video, immersive environments and virtual reality, multicamera systems, management of large data transfer, and general-purpose GPU computing.

With his EDM research group of Visual Computing he participated in European and national research and development projects on the intersection of arts, cinema, TV broadcasting, and visual computing.

Philippe Bekaert was convinced of the need to work together with creatives in the arts and entertainment: “We want to stretch the boundaries of the use of technology, not by creating faster systems and problem-solving devices, but by asking what we can do with this technology to enhance human perception and experience“. He worked closely together with theatre and live performance company CREW in about 13 VR and MR based performance.

He was initiator and cofounder of spin-off companies like AZilPix, Camargus and Panokkel, commercializing broadcast video production systems following novel approaches.

== Early life and education ==
Philippe Bekaert was born in 1967 during a Sabena flight Kinshasa-Geneva-Brussels. Philippe finished his engineering education from KU Leuven with a Master in Physics (1985-1991) and a Master in Informatics (1991-1993). He was married to oncologist Annelies Maes and has three daughters.

== Expertise Centre for Digital Media ==
Philippe joined EDM on the 1st of August 2002 as a full-time professor of informatics and headed the research group of Visual Computing. He participated in numerous European and national research and development programs, and has 208 publications.

== CREW ==
Philippe Bekaert and artist Eric Joris of CREW (performance company) started cooperating in 2003 at EDM of Hasselt University. Philippe started developing for CREW and in 2006 joined the Board of Directors. EDM and CREW teamed up in EU research FP7 programs 2020 3D media 2009-2013 and Dreamspace 2013-2016, in the EU Culture Programme New Media, performing arts and spectatorship 2009-2011, in Belgian national and regional [ej4] research programs like IBBT Art&D Programme VR/Real Virtuality 2008-2009, XPlo eXplorative Television Project 2011-2013 and in the EU Transregional program Transdigital 2010-2012.

For ‘Crash’ 2004 Philippe custom built omnidirectional cameras, wrote live, stitching and editing software, as well as he composed the technical configuration. The immersants in this production wore HMD’s and were manipulated at a kind of tilting beds, to produce certain illusions and to overcome simulator or motion sickness. With "U_Raging Standstill" (2005) and "Eux" (2009) the whole configuration became mobile with the immersant walking around. For "O_Rex" Philippe developed an outside-in tracking system based upon the work of Ramesh Raskar. The system had to steer laptops on a driving platform in a 3D physical space, augmenting the world behind their screen. For ‘Line-up’ (2007) and ‘Terra Nova’ (2011) he built a configuration and a pipeline for immersing 12 until 55 participants together in a live theatrical performance. "Terra Nova" premiered at the Festival of Avignon in 2011. "W_DoubleU" (2009) and "Headswap" (2013) have two walking immersants observe the world using each other’s view: “Each of the participants receives an HMD helmet that allows her/him to see the environment around the other one’s head. They both have to find their way in public space [...] a schizophrenic relationship with your immersive counterpart”. The work with CREW was performed in Europe, Northern America, and Asia in conferences, festivals and arthouses like Festival d’Avignon (FR), Spielart (DE), Shangai world Expo (CH), Empac (US), Siggraph (US), FMX (DE) and Steirisches Herbst Graz (AU).

== Death ==
Bekaert died on 31 July 2022.
