= Horizon mapping =

3D graphics texturing technique

Horizon mapping is a texture mapping technique in 3D computer graphics used to simulate realistic self-shadowing on surfaces with displaced details, such as bump maps or other digital elevation models (DEMs). It achieves this by pre-recording the shape of the surrounding terrain for every point on a surface, allowing the graphics engine to quickly check if a light source is blocked by these features. This results in the illusion of bumps casting shadows on one another, greatly enhancing depth perception without the performance cost of modifying the underlying 3D geometry. Horizon mapping was introduced by Nelson L. Max in 1988.

Modern implementations of horizon mapping are often compressed to save memory and are frequently used for rendering massive, tile-based environments like planetary terrains.

== History and purpose ==
Standard bump mapping creates the illusion of surface detail by perturbing surface normals, but it does not account for the "bumps" casting shadows on each other. Horizon mapping was introduced by Nelson L. Max in his 1988 paper, Horizon mapping: shadows for bump-mapped surfaces, to overcome this limitation. By precomputing how much light is blocked by the surrounding geometry, the technique enables fast, realistic self-shadowing that dramatically enhances depth perception without the performance cost of rendering full 3D geometry.

== Mechanism ==
The core mechanism of horizon mapping relies on precomputing the profile of the visible horizon. For each pixel or point on the terrain texture, the algorithm calculates the maximum elevation angle of the surrounding geometry across a set of quantized azimuthal directions.

During real-time rendering, the engine calculates the elevation and azimuth of the scene's light source (such as the Sun). By mapping the light's azimuth to the precomputed discrete directions and interpolating the corresponding horizon elevation, the algorithm can instantly compare the light's angle against the local horizon. If the light source's elevation is below the recorded horizon elevation, the point is in shadow. If it is above, it is illuminated.

== Modern applications ==
Horizon mapping is highly advantageous for massive, tile-based environments, such as planetary-scale video games, flight simulators, or scientific visualizations. Because all the information required to calculate shadows is stored locally in the horizon map texture, the rendering engine does not need to keep massive amounts of out-of-view terrain geometry loaded in memory to cast accurate shadows.

Recent research has further optimized the memory footprint of this technique. For example, a 2025 paper demonstrated that using a truncated Fourier series can compress the horizon data into a single multi-resolution texture, enabling engines to render real-time soft shadows on planetary scales with a minimal memory budget.

== See also ==
- Displacement mapping
- Normal mapping
- Parallax occlusion mapping
- Shadow mapping
