= Self-shadowing =

Computer graphics lighting effect

Self-Shadowing is a computer graphics lighting effect, used in 3D rendering applications such as computer animation and video games. Self-shadowing allows non-static objects in the environment, such as game characters and interactive objects (buckets, chairs, etc.), to cast shadows on themselves and each other. For example, without self-shadowing, if a character puts their right arm over the left, the right arm will not cast a shadow over the left arm. If that same character places a hand over a ball, that hand will cast a shadow over the ball.

One thing that needs to be specified is whether the shadow being cast is dynamic or static. A wall with a shadow on it is a static shadow. The wall is not moving and so its geometric shape is not going to move or change in the scene. A dynamic shadow is something that has its geometry changes within a scene.

Self-Shadowing methods have trade-offs between quality and speed depending on the desired result. To keep speed up, some techniques rely on fast and low resolution solutions which could result in wrong looking shadows which may be out of place in a scene. Others require the CPU and GPU to calculate with algorithms the exact location and shape of a shadow with a high level of accuracy. This requires a lot of computational overhead, which older machines could not handle.

== Techniques ==
=== Height Field Self-Shadowing ===
A technique was created where a shadow on a rough surface can be calculated quickly by finding the high points along from the light source's origin and ignoring any other geometric points underneath the peaks. Imagine facing a sunrise in the mountains where the light hits a peak in front of you where you are still in the dark. The computer wouldn’t need to account for you casting a shadow or receiving light since you are below the peak in front you. “Height Field Self-Shadowing” renders self-shadows on dynamic height fields under dynamic light environments in real time.

=== 3D Hair ===
Self-Shadowing can be used for interactive hair animation, which is normally very difficult for computers to render due to the major increase in individual geometric shapes that hair can take. Self shadowing is a major part of a 3d application that contributes to the impression of volume.

Deep shadow maps, introduced by Tom Lokovic and Eric Veach at Pixar in 2000, allow for high-quality self-shadowing in complex and volumetric primitives like hair, fur, and smoke. Unlike traditional shadow maps that store a single depth value per pixel, deep shadow maps store a visibility function (or transmittance function) representing fractional light penetration at all possible depths. This technique enables realistic light attenuation and volumetric soft shadows, and was famously used in feature films such as Monsters, Inc. to render dense hair and fur.

=== Shadow volume ===
Shadow volume is one way that self-shadowing can be used in a 3D image or scene. The method basically makes a 3D object occupy an enclosed volume in a scene where a shadow is being cast. This allows the renderer, or shader, to perform an analysis on whether or not the point or pixel is inside a shadowed area. This eventually allows the program to determine how the object will be lit.

=== Shadow Maps ===
3D shadow mapping renders the scene from the light source's point of view to store a depth map, then compares each visible point in the camera view against that light-space depth to determine whether it is shadowed. Standard shadow maps are prone to false self-shadowing because samples in the camera view and light view do not align exactly; this is usually mitigated with a depth bias, but too much bias can displace the shadow boundary.

=== Radiosity Normal Mapping ===
Chris Green of Valve, a video game maker, says that bump map data is derived from geometric descriptions of the object's surface but significant lighting cues due to lighting occlusion by surface details is not calculated. A common fix is to use an additional texture channel to create an ambient occlusion field. This only provides a darkening effect that is not connected to the direction of the light source on acting on the surface.

== History ==
Shadow volume was proposed by Frank Crow in 1977. The advantage of a shadow volume was that is could be used to shadow everything, including itself.

== See also ==
- Shadow mapping
- Shadow volume
- Unified lighting and shadowing
