= Shader lamps =

Computer graphic technique

Shader lamps is a computer graphic technique used to change the appearance of physical objects. The still or moving objects are illuminated, using one or more video projectors, by static or animated texture or video stream. The method was invented at University of North Carolina at Chapel Hill by Ramesh Raskar, Greg Welch, Kok-lim Low and Deepak Bandyopadhyay in 1999 as a follow on to Spatial Augmented Reality also invented at University of North Carolina at Chapel Hill in 1998 by Ramesh Raskar, Greg Welch and Henry Fuchs.

A 3D graphic rendering software is typically used to compute the deformation caused by the non perpendicular, non-planar or even complex projection surface.

Complex objects (or aggregation of multiple simple objects) create self shadows that must be compensated by using several projectors.

The objects are typically replaced by neutral color ones, the projection giving all its visual properties, thus the name shader lamps.

The technique can be used to create a sense of invisibility, by rendering transparency. The object is illuminated not by a replacement of its own visual properties, but by the corresponding visual surface placed behind the object as seen from an arbitrary viewing point.

== See also ==
- Projection augmented model
- Projection mapping
