= MIT NETRA =

NETRA is a mobile eye diagnostic device developed at MIT Media Lab consisting of a clip-on eyepiece and a software app for smart phones. The co-inventors include Ramesh Raskar and Vitor Pamplona. It can be seen as the inverse of expensive Shack-Hartmann sensors. NETRA allows for the early, low-cost diagnosis of the most common refractive Refractive Disorders. The subject looks into the device and aligns patterns on the display. By repeating this procedure for eight meridians, the required refractive correction is computed. NETRA exploits the fact that aberrations are expressed using only a few parameters (Spherical, Cylindrical and Axis of Astigmatism) to create an easier user interaction approach. Leveraging mobile connectivity, the system can transmit test data to appropriate facilities for immediate action, aggregate data for use in analysis, or instruct a separate machine for automatic dispensing of spectacles.

The key enabling factor for this new technology is the resolution of modern LCDs. The available resolution is now half of the width of the human hair. This is only a third of the working resolution of high-end ophthalmology instruments. At this level, LCDs available in modern mobile phones can be re-purposed to achieve performance that compares with the highest end scientific instruments.

NETRA can be thought as a thermometer for visual performance. Just like the thermometer measures the body temperature at one's convenience, the device provides a quantitative measurement of the refractive error without the need of a physician on the ground. The test can be performed anywhere, enabling people to know when they need to see a doctor. The need for accessible, low cost eye diagnostics like NETRA is tremendous and is global in scale—over half a billion people have uncorrected refractive errors.
