= Apparent contour =

In geometry, the apparent contour of 3D object with surface $S$, with respect to a point light source, $\mathbf{p}$ and a screen, is the image of those points on the surface where the rays from $p$ are tangent to the surface. If the surface is well-behaved the apparent contour includes the boundary of the silhouette of the surface as it can include segments inside the boundary. It is theoretically possible to reconstruct the surface from a series of apparent contours, an important problem in computer vision.

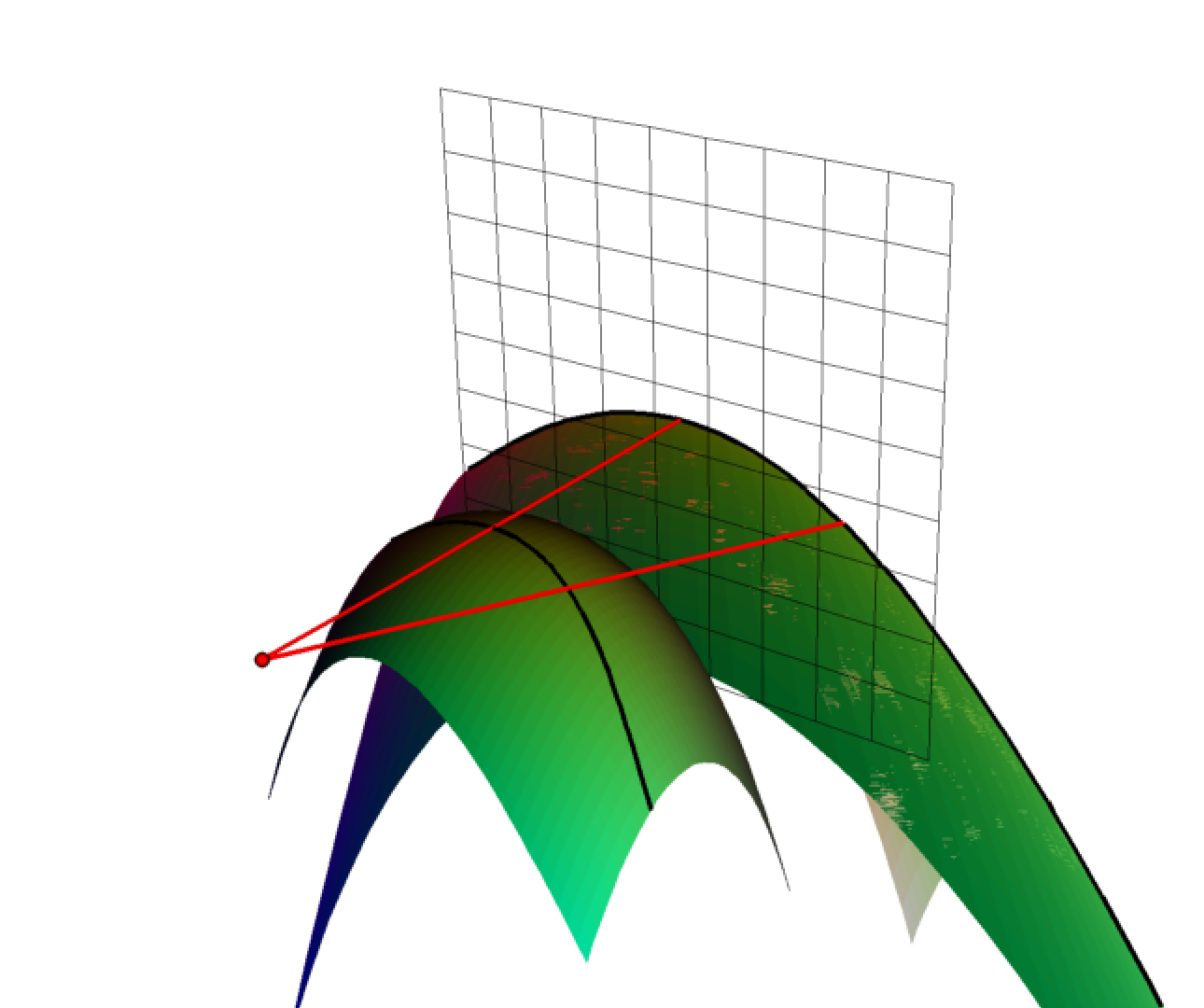
A simple apparent contour

== Definition ==
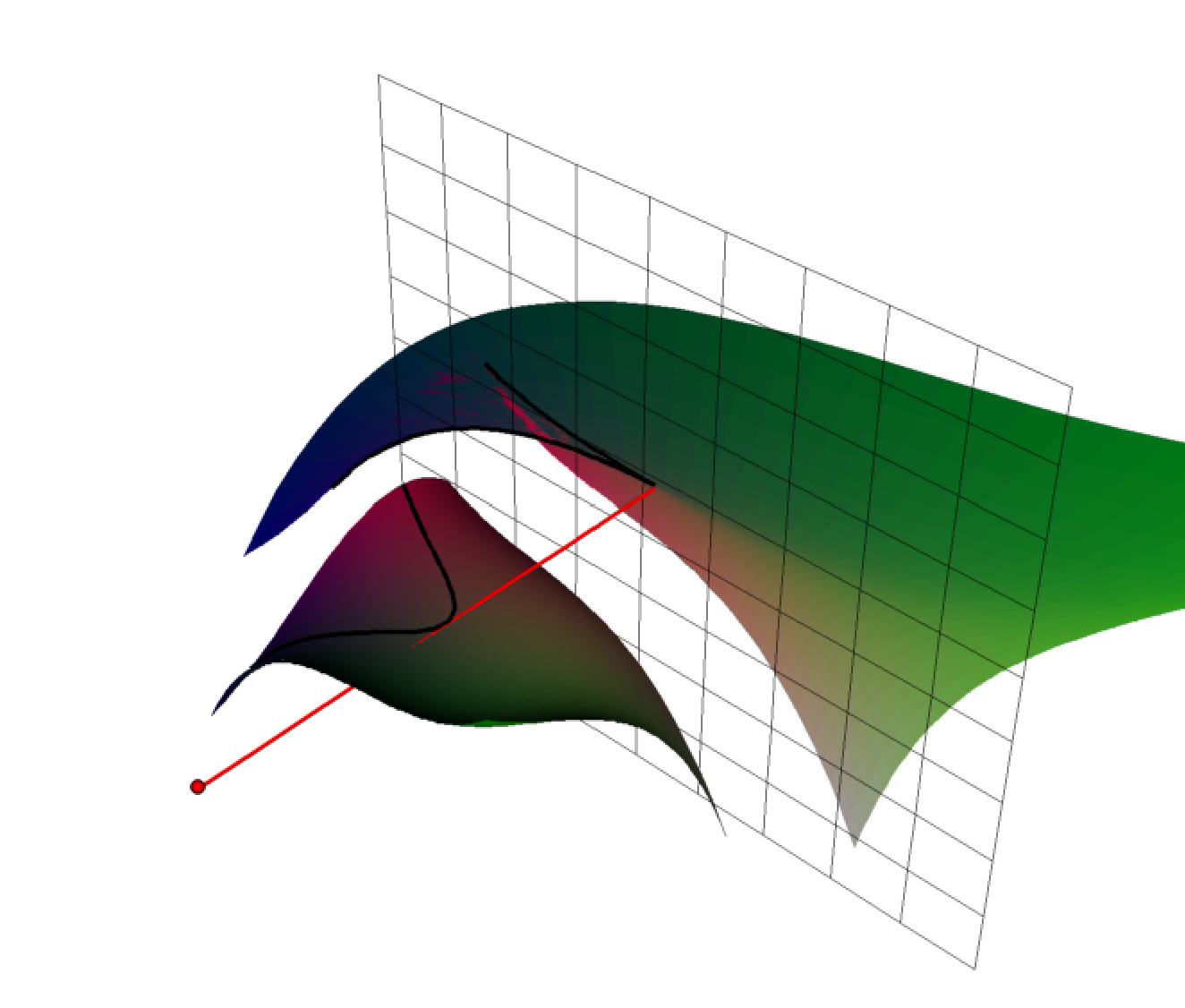
A cusp on an apparent contour, generate when the ray passes along an asymptotic direction

Let $\mathbf{c}$ be a point light source, $S$ a surface with unit normals $\mathbf{n}$, and $P$ a unit sphere centred on $\mathbf{c}$. Define two sets:

$$\begin{align}
\Gamma &= \{ \mathbf{r} \in S : (\mathbf{r}-\mathbf{c}) \cdot \mathbf{n} = 0 \} \\
\gamma &= \{ \mathbf{p} : p = (\mathbf{r} -\mathbf{c}) / \| \mathbf{r} -\mathbf{c} \|, \mathbf{r} \in \Gamma \}
\end{align}$$

$\Gamma$ is called the contour generator, and $\gamma$ the apparent contour. The definition can be generalised to project onto a plane, or have parallel light rays.

The apparent contour can be considered as the envelope of projections of a family of curves on the surface.

The apparent contour can have cusps when the ray has higher order contact with the surface. This occurs when the ray is in asymptotic direction in a hyperbolic region of the surface. Higher singularities occur when the ray is tangent to a parabolic line or flat umbilic on the surface. Only a limited

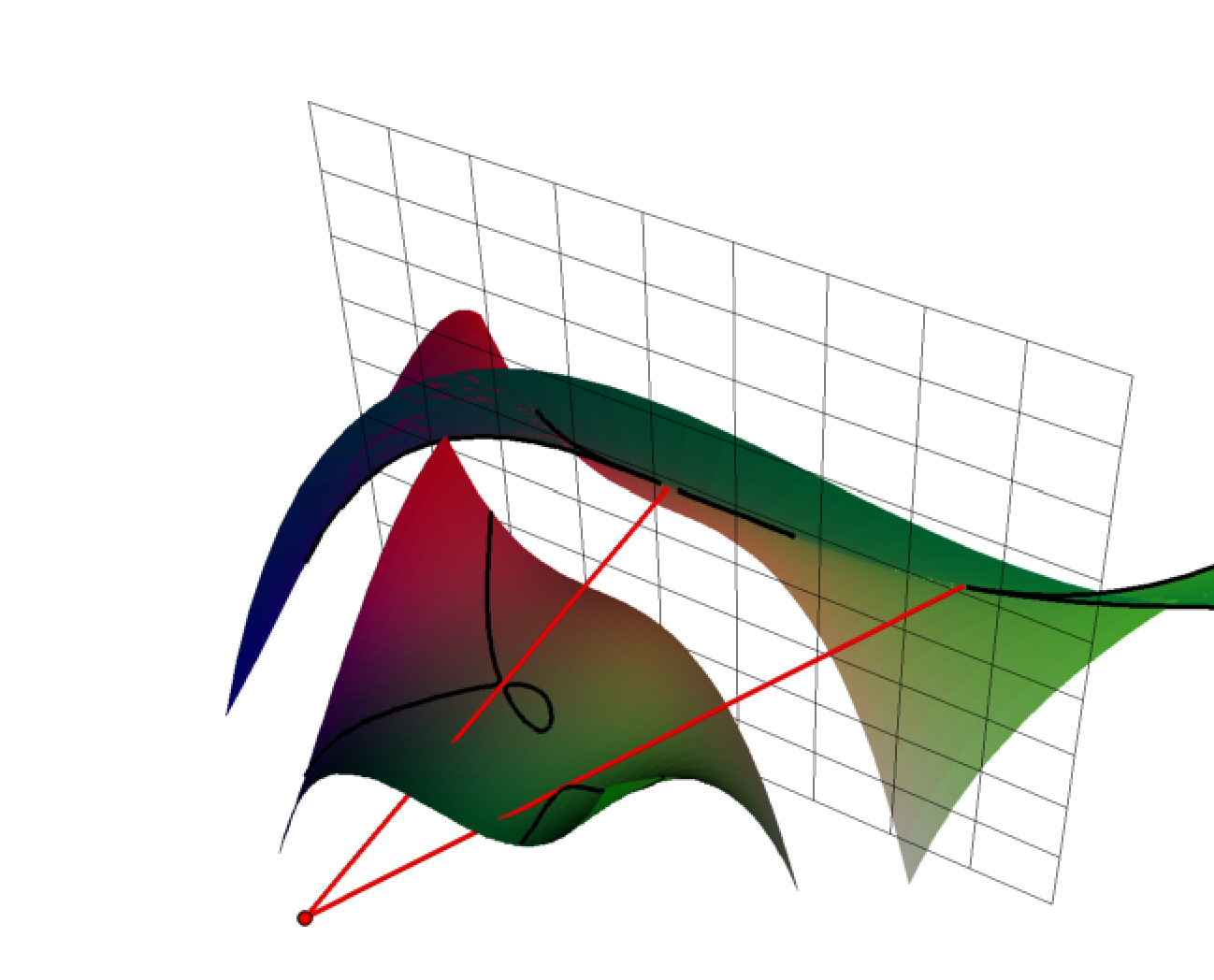
A more complex apparent contour, showing a rhamphoid cusp when the ray is tangent to a parabolic line, and a beak singularity when the ray is tangent to a flat umbilic

== See also ==
- Silhouette edge
