= Ramesh Raskar =

Indian-American scientist and professor

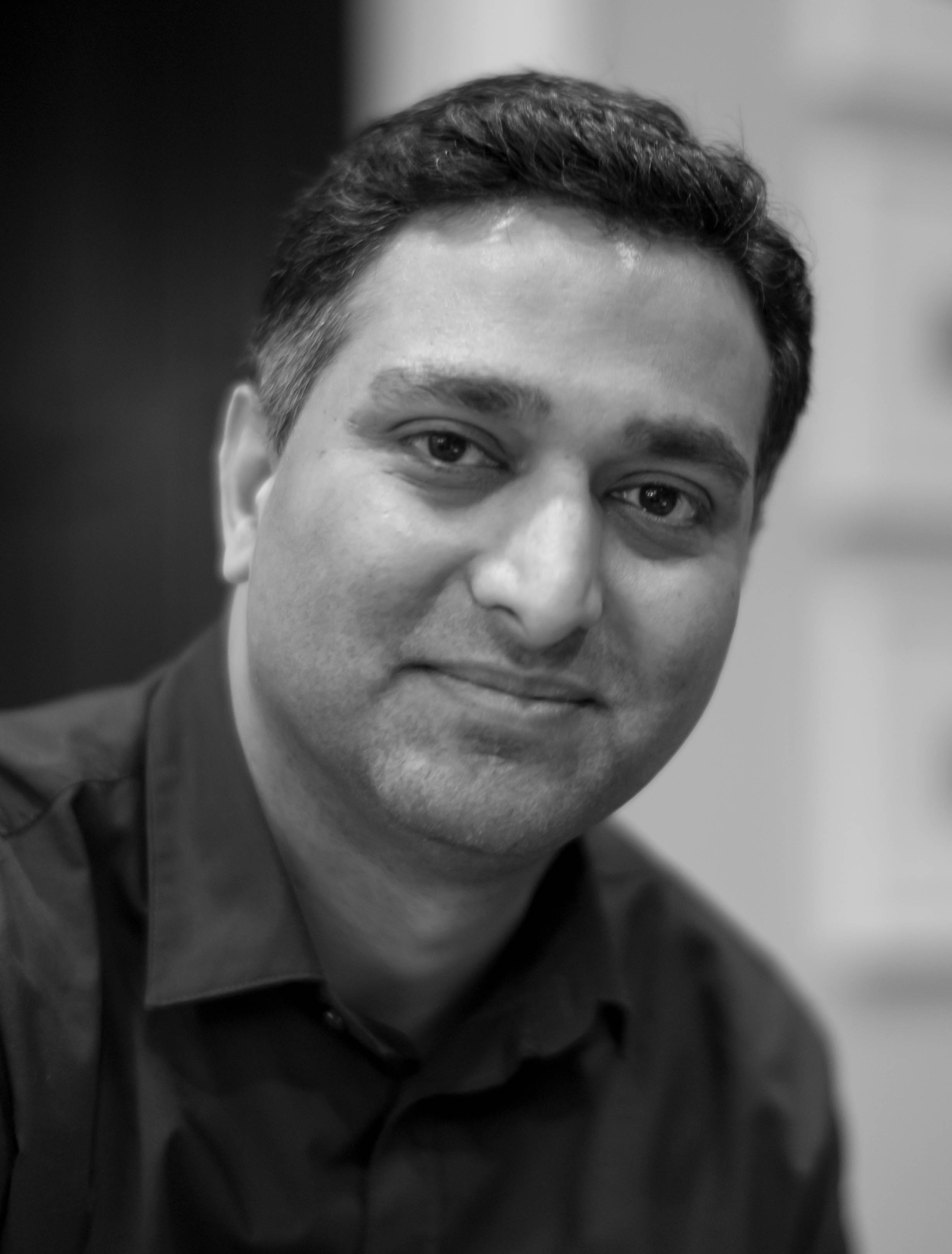
- Raskar in 2013
- Born: 1970 (age 55–56); Nashik, Maharashtra, India
- Citizenship: American
- Education: (B.S.) College of Engineering, Pune (MS) University of Iowa (PhD) University of North Carolina at Chapel Hill
- Known for: Shader lamps, Femtophotography, CORNAR, Computational photography, HR3D, EyeNetra StreetAddressForAll
- Awards: TR100, Lemelson–MIT Prize, ACM SIGGRAPH Achievement Award 2017
- Scientific career
- Fields: Computer scientist
- Workplaces: Massachusetts Institute of Technology
- Doctoral advisor: Henry Fuchs and Greg Welch

Ramesh Raskar is an Indian-American computer scientist and is the associate professor and head of the MIT Media Lab's Camera Culture research group. Previously he worked as a senior research scientist at Mitsubishi Electric Research Laboratories (MERL) during 2002 to 2008. He holds 132 patents in computer vision, computational health, sensors and imaging. He received the $500K Lemelson–MIT Prize in 2016. He is mostly known for his work in photography.

In February 2020, Raskar and his team launched Private Kit: SafePaths, a public health tool for contact tracing for COVID-19 pandemic. He is also the Founder and Chief Scientist of PathCheck. He is a co-founder of Akasha.im which was acquired by Alphabet spin-off company Intrinsic.

== Early life and education ==
Ramesh Raskar was born in Nashik, India and he finished his engineering education from College of Engineering, Pune. He finished his PhD at UNC Chapel Hill in 2002.

== Mitsubishi Electric Research Laboratories ==
Raskar joined Mitsubishi Electric Research Laboratories in 2002. His significant contribution in computer vision and imaging domain led him to win 'TR 100' in 2004, 'The Global Indus Technovator Award' in 2004 respectively.

== MIT Media Lab ==
Raskar joined MIT Media Lab in 2008. Raskar, together with others developed a computational display technology that allows observers with refractive errors, cataracts and some other eye disorders to perceive a focused image on a screen without wearing refraction-corrective spectacles. The technology uses a light field display in combination with customized filtering algorithms that pre-distort the presented content for the observer.

His lab produced a number of extreme highspeed pictures using a femto-camera that took images at around one-trillion frames per second. They have also developed a camera to see around corners using bursts of laser light.

He was involved in the Siggraph NEXT program at Siggraph 2015 in Los Angeles.

Raskar was awarded the "2017 CG Achievement Award" by ACM SIGGRAPH for his potential contribution in computational photography and light transport and their applications for social impact.

Startups created by members of his CameraCulture research group include EyeNetra.com (ophthalmic tests), Photoneo (high speed 3D sensing), Labby (AI for food testing), Lumii (novel printing for 3D imagery), LensBricks (computer vision with computational imaging), Tesseract (personalized display) and more. Non-profits emerging from his efforts include REDX.io (AI for Social Impact), MIT Emerging Worlds, LVP-MITra, REDX-WeSchool, DigitalImpactSquare and more.

He serves on the Expert Commission of the Botnar Fondation as an AI and Health expert.

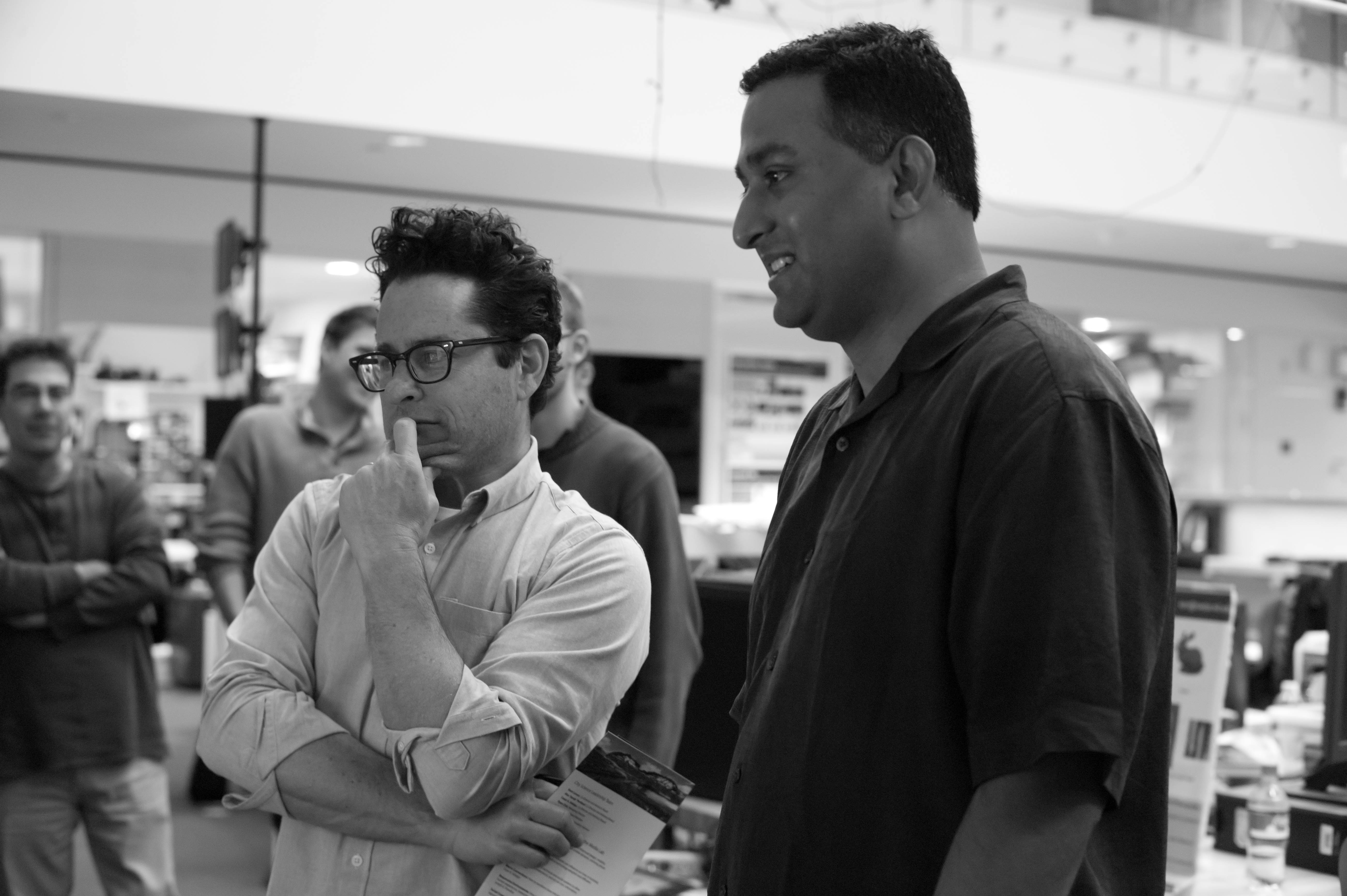
JJ Abrams and Ramesh Raskar at MIT Media Lab, 2012

== Philosophies on innovation ==
Raskar has presented a series of talks and workshops on innovation processes.

They include his Idea Hexagon, How to give an engaging talk, How to prepare for a thesis, How to write a paper and the Spot-Probe method for problem–solution identification. In 2019, he presented doctoral hooding commencement speech at UNC Chapel Hill.

=== Philosophy of DAPS/DOPS and its global impact ===
In his recent talk, Raskar mentioned, "Instead of apps, let’s think about DAPS (Digital Applications for Physical Services) Or DOPS. If you want to make it broader, we can have DOPS (Digital Opportunities for Physical Services). With DOPS and DAPS we have an opportunity to impact the physical world in areas where we simply couldn’t before".

== Awards and fellowships ==
- TR100 Award from Technology Review (recognizes top young innovators under the age of 35)
- The Global Indus Technovator Award (instituted at MIT to recognize the top 20 Indian technology innovators worldwide)
- MIT Sloan Research Fellowship
- DARPA Young Faculty Award
- LAUNCH Health Innovation Award, presented by NASA, USAID, US State Dept and NIKE
- PharmaVOICE 100
- Vodafone Wireless Innovation Project Award (first place)
- Lemelson–MIT Prize ($500,000)
- 2017 ACM SIGGRAPH Achievement Award
- 2019 Jack Dangermond Award $10,000 for GeoSpatial Research in a Journal Paper (for Street Address for All)
- RPS (The Royal Photographic Society) Award for Imaging Science
