= Z-fighting =

Rendering issue in 3D modeling

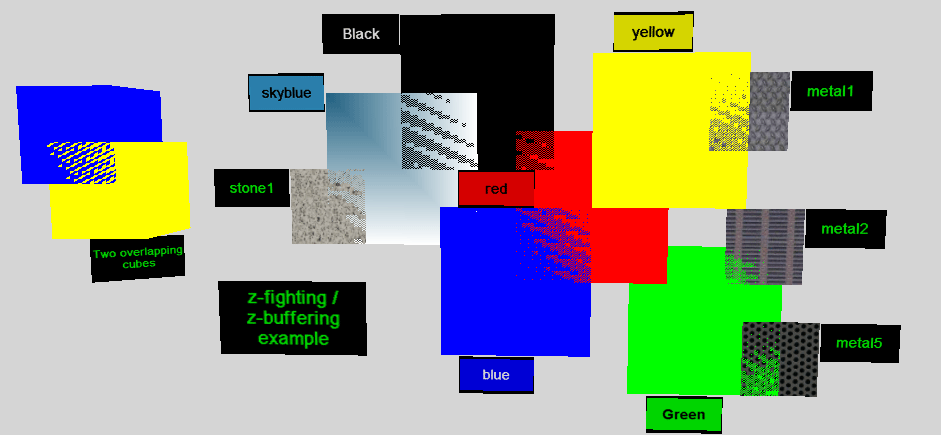
Demonstration of z-fighting with multiple colors and textures over a grey background

Z-fighting, also called stitching or planefighting, is a phenomenon in 3D rendering that occurs when two or more primitives have very similar distance to the camera. This would cause them to have near-similar or identical values in the z-buffer, which keeps track of depth. This then means when a specific pixel is being rendered, it is ambiguous which one of the two primitives are drawn in that pixel because the z-buffer cannot distinguish precisely which one is further from the other. If one pixel was unambiguously closer, the less close one could be discarded. It is particularly prevalent with coplanar polygons, where two faces occupy essentially the same space, with neither in front. As a result, affected pixels are rendered with fragments from one polygon or the other arbitrarily, in a manner determined by the precision of the z-buffer. It can also vary as the scene or camera is changed, causing one polygon to "win" the z test, then another, and so on. The overall effect is flickering, noisy rasterization of two polygons which "fight" to color the screen pixels. This problem is usually caused by limited sub-pixel precision, floating point and fixed point round-off errors.

The more z-buffer precision one uses, the less likely it is that z-fighting will be encountered. However, for coplanar polygons, the problem is inevitable unless corrective action is taken.

As the distance between near and far clip planes increases, and in particular the close plane is selected near the eye, the greater the likelihood exists that z-fighting between primitives will occur. With large virtual environments inevitably there is an inherent conflict between the need to resolve visibility in the distance and in the foreground, so for example in a space flight simulator, if a distant galaxy is drawn to scale, the viewer will not have the precision to resolve visibility on any cockpit geometry in the foreground (although even a numerical representation would present problems prior to z-buffered rendering). To mitigate these problems, z-buffer precision is weighted towards the near clip plane, but this is not the case with all visibility schemes and it is insufficient to eliminate all z-fighting issues.

== Mitigation ==
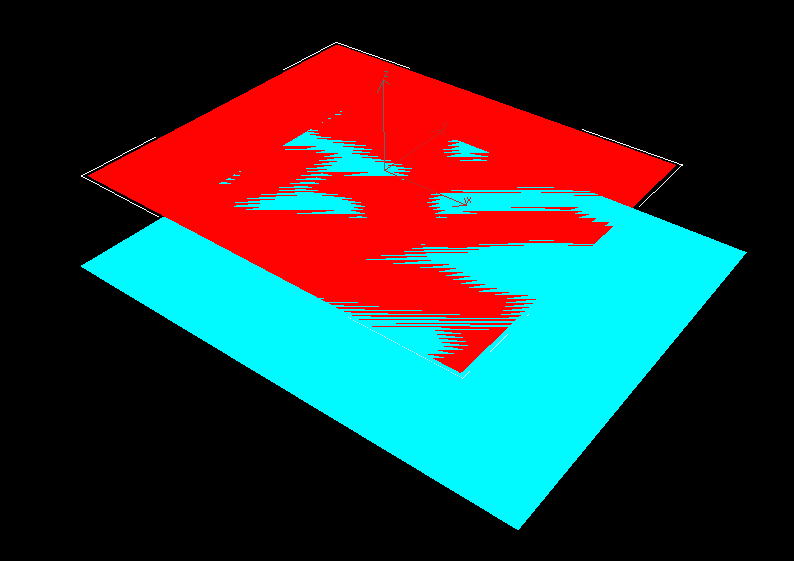
The effect seen on two co-planar polygons

Z-fighting can be reduced through the use of a higher resolution depth buffer, by z-buffering in some scenarios, or by simply moving the polygons further apart. Z-fighting which cannot be entirely eliminated in this manner is often resolved by the use of a stencil buffer, or by applying a post-transformation screen space z-buffer offset to one polygon which does not affect the projected shape on screen, but does affect the z-buffer value to eliminate the overlap during pixel interpolation and comparison. Where z-fighting is caused by different transformation paths in hardware for the same geometry (for example in a multi-pass rendering scheme) it can sometimes be resolved by requesting that the hardware use invariant vertex transformation.

Z-fighting that is caused by insufficient precision in the depth buffer can be resolved by simply reducing the visible distance in the world. This reduces the distance between the near and far planes and solves the precision issue. However, in certain virtual environments where long-distance visibility is essential or where reduced visibility would be unbelievable, such as a space simulator or a flight simulator, this is not possible. Alternative techniques exist in these cases. One of these techniques is to "simulate" the distance of objects far from the user without actually changing their position. For example, if the maximum safe view distance (beyond which z-fighting occurs) is 10,000 units, and an object to be rendered is 15,000 units away, that object could instead be rendered at 10,000 units, but it could be scaled down in proportion to the distance which it was moved. An object that has been scaled down by half will look like it is twice as far as it actually is. If this is done only for objects that are already close to, or at, the maximum view distance, and objects close to the user are rendered normally, this technique should not be noticeable. Another technique that is utilized to reduce or completely eliminate Z-fighting is switching to a logarithmic Z-buffer, reversing Z. This technique is seen in the game Grand Theft Auto V. Due to the way they are encoded, floating-point numbers have much more precision when closer to 0. Here, reversing Z leads to more precision when storing the depth of very distant objects, hence greatly reducing Z-fighting.
