= Ray-traced ambient occlusion =

Ambient occlusion that uses ray tracing

Ray-traced ambient occlusion is a computer graphics technique and ambient occlusion global illumination algorithm using ray-tracing.
