= Franklin C. Crow =

American computer scientist

- Education: University of Utah College of Engineering
- Occupation: Computer scientist
- Known for: Computer graphics
- Notable work: University of Texas; Ohio State University; NYIT; Xerox; PARC; Apple; ATG; Interval Research; Nvidia
- Parents: James F. Crow (father); Ann Crockett (mother)

Franklin "Frank" C. Crow is a computer scientist who has made important contributions to computer graphics, including some of the first practical spatial anti-aliasing techniques. Crow also proposed the shadow volume technique for generating geometrically accurate shadows.

== Education ==
Crow studied electrical engineering at the University of Utah College of Engineering under Ivan Sutherland, a pioneer in computer graphics.

== Career ==
Crow taught at the University of Texas, NYIT and Ohio State University and was involved with research at Xerox PARC, Apple Computer's Advanced Technology Group, and Interval Research.

From 2001 to 2008, he worked for NVIDIA as a GPU architect designing rasterization algorithms.

== Publications ==
- "Parallel Computing for Graphics." Advances in Computer Graphics, 1990:113-140.
- "Parallelism in rendering algorithms." in Graphics Interface 88, June 6–10, 1988, Edmonton, Alberta, Canada. p. 87-96
- "Advanced Image Synthesis - Anti-Aliasing." Advances in Computer Graphics, 1985:419-440.
- "Advanced Image Synthesis - Surfaces." Advances in Computer Graphics, 1985:457-467.
- "Computational Issues in Rendering Anti-Aliased Detail." COMPCON, 1982:238-244.
- "Toward more complicated computer imagery." Computers & Graphics, 5(2–4):61-69 (1980).
- "The Aliasing Problem in Computer-Generated Shaded Images." Commun. ACM, 20(11):799-805 (1977).
- "Shadow Algorithms for Computer Graphics", Computer Graphics (SIGGRAPH '77 Proceedings), vol. 11, no. 2, 242–248.

== See also ==
- University of Texas at Austin
- Texture mapping
