= Eric Haines =

American computer programmer

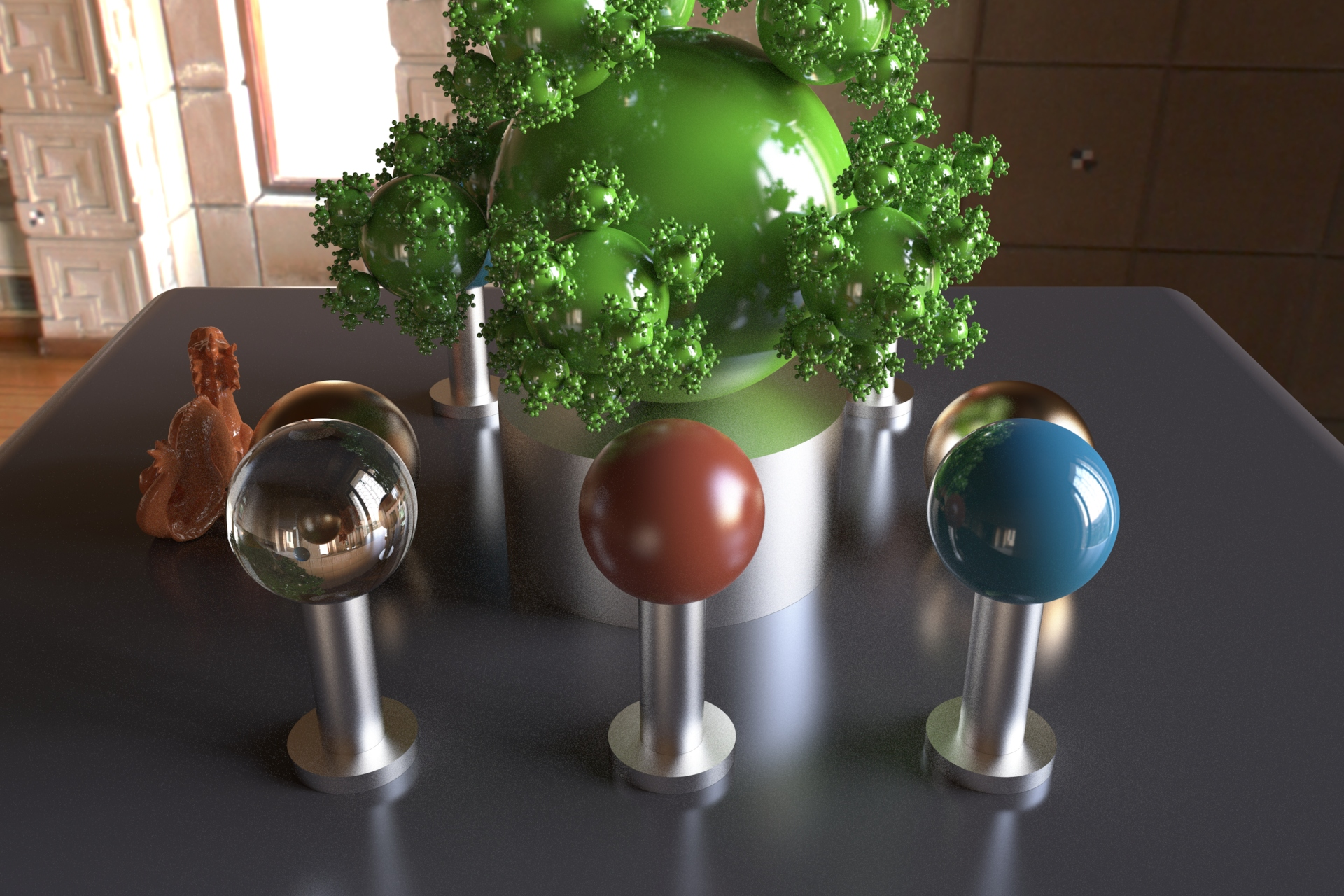
Sphereflake 3D-fractal of Eric Haines

Eric Haines is an American software engineer and expert in computer graphics, specifically image rendering. He was last employed with NVIDIA Corporation as a Distinguished Engineer, retiring in June 2026. He is a co-author of the book Real-Time Rendering, currently in its fourth edition. He also coauthored the book An Introduction to Ray Tracing and co-edited the book Ray Tracing Gems.

Eric Haines earned an M.S. in 1986 from Cornell University. His thesis was The Light Buffer: A Ray Tracer Shadow Testing Accelerator. An image created by software based on the thesis was used on the September 1986 cover of the IEEE Computer Graphics and Applications journal.

He created the Massive open online course Interactive 3D Graphics in 2013 with Udacity. As of July 2013 it had 30,000 enrolled, with 1300-1700 students active over a given week. He authored a chapter in the book An Introduction to Ray Tracing by Andrew Glassner (ed), 1989. He published a number articles in computer graphics, some of which are included in the Graphics Gems series. He also maintains the Graphics Gems code repository.

Haines was on the editorial board of the Journal of Graphics Tools until 2012, at which time he helped found the Journal of Computer Graphics Techniques (JCGT). He was the Editor-in-Chief of JCGT from November 2024 through July 2025.

He was the editor of the online forum of experts in ray tracing, Ray Tracing News (1988-2010) During that time, he coined the term surface acne for the spotty artifacts caused by numerical errors when a small surface area seems to be shadowing itself.

He has pursued multiple personal projects including the Minecraft world mapper and exporter called Mineways.
