= A K Peters =

Publisher of scientific and technical books

A K Peters, Ltd.
- Parent company: CRC Press (Taylor & Francis)
- Status: Acquired 2010 by CRC Press
- Founded: 1992; 34 years ago
- Founder: Alice and Klaus Peters
- Country of origin: United States
- Headquarters location: Natick, Massachusetts
- Publication types: Books
- Nonfiction topics: Computer science and mathematics
- No. of employees: 7 (2001)
- Official website: akpeters.com

A K Peters, Ltd. was a publisher of scientific and technical books, specializing in mathematics and in computer graphics, robotics, and other fields of computer science. They published the journals Experimental Mathematics and the Journal of Graphics Tools, as well as mathematics books geared to children.

== Background ==
Klaus Peters wrote a doctoral dissertation on complex manifolds at the University of Erlangen in 1962, supervised by Reinhold Remmert. He then joined Springer Verlag, becoming their first specialist mathematics editor. As a Springer director from 1971, he hired Alice Merker for Springer New York: they were married that year, and moved to Heidelberg. Leaving Springer, they founded Birkhäuser Boston in 1979; Birkhäuser ran into financial difficulties, and was taken over by Springer. Klaus and Alice then spent a period running a Boston office for Harcourt Brace Jovanovich and their imprint Academic Press. With the takeover of Harcourt Brace Jovanovich by General Cinema Corporation, the couple then found funding from Elwyn Berlekamp to start their own company.

== Company history ==
The company was founded in November 1992 by Alice and Klaus Peters, and maintained as a privately held corporation by the Peters. In 2006 William Randolph Hearst III and David Mumford joined the board. According to Robert J. Lang, who published with them a book on origami and mathematics, A K Peters "was a business, but first and foremost [Klaus] really wanted to create books that were works of art." The Encyclopedia of the Consumer Movement noted A K Peters as "a small publisher who enjoys a fine reputation in Mathematics".

In 2010, A K Peters was acquired by CRC Press, which is owned by Taylor & Francis. In January 2012, Taylor & Francis terminated the employment of Alice and Klaus Peters. On July 7, 2014, Klaus Peters died.

== Topics ==
=== Experimental mathematics ===
In 1992 David Epstein, Klaus Peters and Silvio Levy set up the journal Experimental Mathematics, with scope the use of computers in pure mathematics. At the time the Notices of the American Mathematical Society was running a "Computers and Mathematics" section, launched in 1988. The particular focus of the "experimental mathematics" included in the journal was the computer-assisted development of mathematical conjectures.

The traditional context in pure mathematics was that "journals only publish theorems"; in this area A K Peters innovated. Klaus Peters had a particular interest in visualization for experimentation in low-dimensional geometry. The Journal of Graphics Tools was published by A K Peters from 1996, after an approach from Andrew Glassner, then with Microsoft Research. They also published the journal Internet Mathematics from its 2003 founding by Fan Chung until the acquisition of the publisher by Taylor & Francis.

A K Peters, with the participation of Jonathan Borwein, published as books three collective works on experimental mathematics: Mathematics by Experiment and Experimentation in Mathematics in 2004, and Experimental Mathematics in Action (2007). Klaus Peters suggested a further book, The Computer as Crucible: An Introduction to Experimental Mathematics (2008), authored by Borwein and Keith Devlin.

=== Combinatorial game theory ===
Another topic frequently published by A K Peters, sparked by the interest of backer Elwyn Berlekamp, was combinatorial game theory. Their books in this area included Mathematical Go: Chilling Gets the Last Point (1994), The Dots and Boxes Game: Sophisticated Child's Play (2000), Hex Strategy: Making the Right Connections (2001), Winning Ways for your Mathematical Plays (in four volumes, 2001–2004, 2nd edition, after the original two-volume edition by Academic Press in 1982), Connection Games: Variations on a Theme (2005), Lessons in Play: An Introduction to Combinatorial Game Theory (2007), and Games, Puzzles, and Computation (2009).
