= Journal of Computer Graphics Techniques =

- Discipline: Computer graphics
- Language: English
- Edited by: Marc Olano

Publication details
- History: 2012–present
- Frequency: Quarterly

Standard abbreviations
- ISO 4: J. Comput. Graph. Tech.

Indexing
- ISSN: 2331-7418
- LCCN: 2013273384
- OCLC no.: 861618594

Links
- Journal homepage; Online archive

The Journal of Computer Graphics Techniques is a diamond open-access peer-reviewed scientific journal covering computer graphics. It was established in May 2012 when a large part of the editorial board resigned from the now-defunct Journal of Graphics Tools. The first editor-in-chief was Morgan McGuire, 2012-2015, next was Marc Olano (University of Maryland, Baltimore County), 2015-2025, then Eric Haines, 2024-2025. The current editor-in-chief is Alexander Wilkie (Charles University).

Journal of Graphics Tools
- Discipline: Computer graphics
- Language: English
- Edited by: Francesco Banterle

Publication details
- Former names: Journal of Graphics, GPU, & Game Tools
- History: 1996–2015
- Publisher: A K Peters/Taylor & Francis
- Frequency: Quarterly

Standard abbreviations
- ISO 4: J. Graph. Tools

Indexing
- ISSN: 2165-347X (print); 2165-3488 (web)

Links
- Journal homepage; Online archive

The Journal of Graphics Tools was a quarterly peer-reviewed scientific journal covering computer graphics. It was established in 1996 and published by A K Peters, now part of Taylor & Francis. From 2009 to 2011 the journal was published as the Journal of Graphics, GPU, & Game Tools. In 2012, a large part of the editorial board resigned to form the open access Journal of Computer Graphics Techniques. The last editor-in-chief was Francesco Banterle (Istituto di Scienza e Tecnologie dell'Informazione). Previous editors-in-chief have been Andrew Glassner, Ronen Barzel, Doug Roble, and Morgan McGuire. The final volume was released in 2013 and the journal formally ceased with its final issue in 2015.
