= Maureen C. Stone =

American computer scientist

Maureen C. Stone is an American computer scientist, specializing in color modeling.

== Biography ==
Stone has bachelor's and master's degrees from the University of Illinois at Urbana–Champaign and another master's degree from the California Institute of Technology. She worked for many years at Xerox PARC. After leaving PARC, she founded a consulting firm in the Seattle, Washington area in 1998, and became is an adjunct professor in the School for Interactive Arts and Technology at Simon Fraser University in Vancouver, British Columbia, Canada. She joined Tableau Research in 2011, and headed the company as its senior director before retiring as a senior principal research scientist there.

Stone was program chair for SIGGRAPH in 1987, and editor-in-chief of the journal IEEE Computer Graphics and Applications from 2007 to 2010.

== Research ==
Stone began working in computer graphics in the early 1970s, as part of the PLATO project at the University of Illinois. She is the author of the book A Field Guide to Digital Color, and has performed pioneering research on color management for digital printing. She has also collaborated with colleagues from PARC on research in human–computer interaction; some of her highly cited works in this area concern snapping to nearby objects in point and click interfaces, transparent user interface elements, and interaction with high-resolution video displays.

== Recognition ==
In 2020, Stone was listed in the IEEE Visualization Academy by the IEEE Visualization and Graphics Technical Community.

== Selected publications ==
=== Articles ===
- Bier, Eric A.; Stone, Maureen C. (1986), "Snap-dragging", Proceedings of the 13th annual conference on Computer graphics and interactive techniques, SIGGRAPH '86, New York, NY, USA: ACM, pp. 233–240, doi:10.1145/15922.15912, ISBN 978-0-89791-196-2.
- Stone, Maureen C.; Cowan, William B.; Beatty, John C. (1988), "Color gamut mapping and the printing of digital color images", ACM Transactions on Graphics, 7 (4): 249–292, doi:10.1145/46165.48045, S2CID 579055.
- Bier, Eric A.; Stone, Maureen C.; Pier, Ken; Buxton, William; DeRose, Tony D. (1993), "Toolglass and magic lenses: the see-through interface", Proceedings of the 20th annual conference on Computer graphics and interactive techniques, SIGGRAPH '93, New York, NY, USA: ACM, pp. 73–80, doi:10.1145/166117.166126, ISBN 978-0-89791-601-1, S2CID 53114308.
- Guimbretière, François; Stone, Maureen; Winograd, Terry (2001), "Fluid interaction with high-resolution wall-size displays", Proceedings of the 14th annual ACM symposium on User interface software and technology, UIST '01, New York, NY, USA: ACM, pp. 21–30, CiteSeerX 10.1.1.225.5045, doi:10.1145/502348.502353, ISBN 978-1-58113-438-4, S2CID 1300430.

=== Books ===
- Stone, Maureen C. (2003), A Field Guide to Digital Color, A K Peters, ISBN 978-1-56881-161-1.

=== Reports ===
- Stone, Maureen; Laskowski, S.; Lowry, S. (2008), Guidelines for Using Color in Voting Systems, NIST Interagency/Internal Report (NISTIR), vol. 7537, National Institute of Standards and Technology
