= William Fetter =

American graphic designer

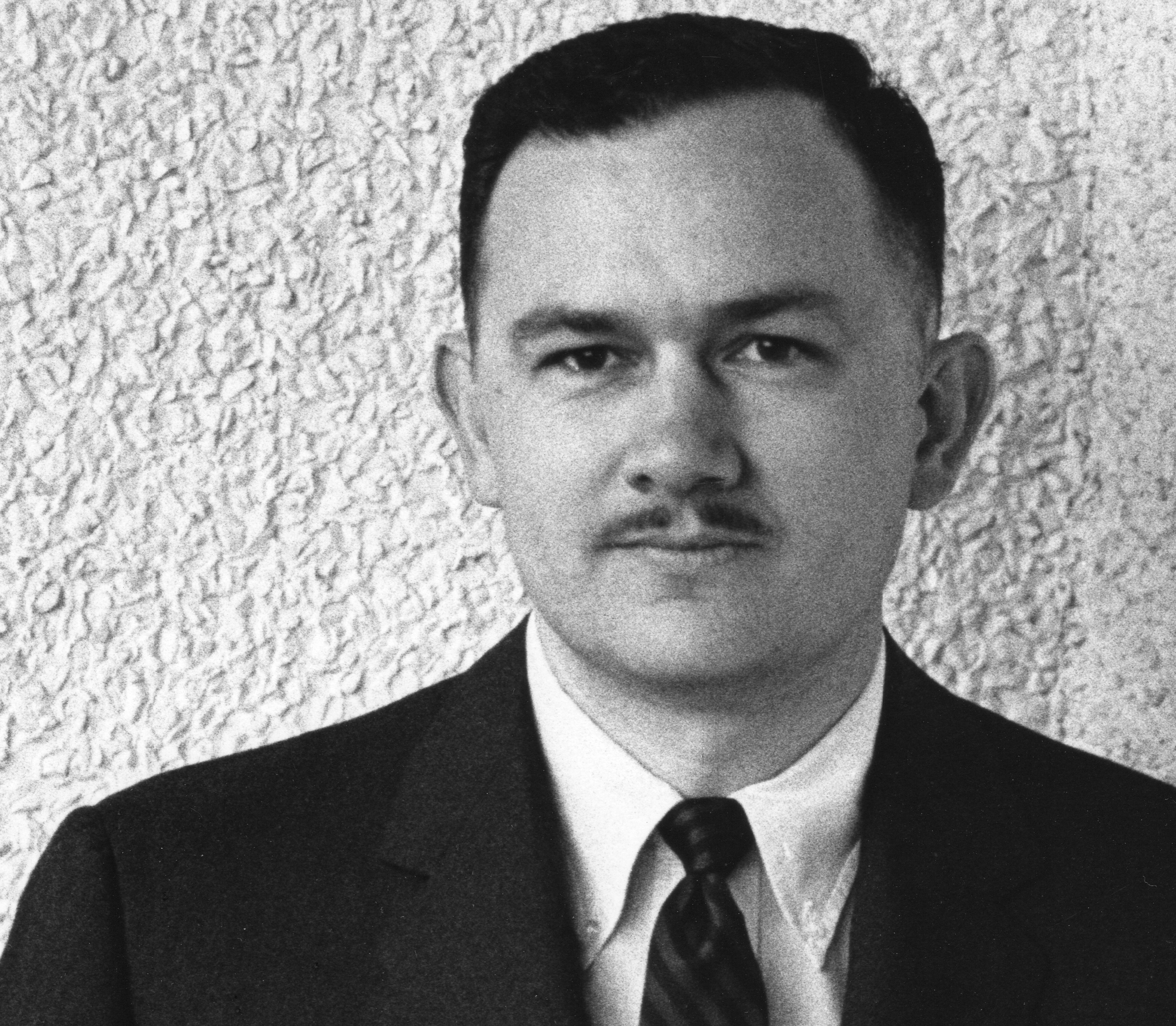
- William Fetter when he worked for Boeing Aircraft
- Born: William Allan Fetter; March 14, 1928; Independence, Missouri, U.S.
- Died: June 23, 2002 (aged 74); Bellevue, Washington, U.S.
- Occupations: Director and CEO of Siroco, a research corporation, Chair of Design Department for SIU; Communications Design Director, Boeing, Seattle
- Spouse: Barbara Shaffer Fetter (born Shaffer) (1965–2002, his death)
- Children: 2

William Fetter (March 14, 1928 – June 23, 2002), also known as William Allan Fetter or Bill Fetter, was an American graphic designer and pioneer in the field of computer graphics. He explored the perspective fundamentals of computer animation of a human figure from 1960 on and was the first to create a human figure as a 3D model. The First Man was a pilot in a short 1964 computer animation, also known as Boeing Man and now as Boeman by the Boeing company. Fetter preferred the term "Human Figure" for the pilot. In 1960, working in a team supervised by Verne Hudson, he helped coin the term Computer graphics. He was art director at the Boeing Company in Wichita.

== Life ==
Born in Independence, Missouri, Fetter attended school in Englewood and graduated in 1945 from Northeast High School in Kansas City. He studied at the University of Illinois where he was awarded a BA in graphic design in 1952. His professional career started while studying at the University of Illinois Press (UIP), an American university press. Employed there from 1952 to 1954, even at this early date he thought of using computers as a tool for his work as a graphic designer. He wrote in 1966:

The need for a computer to simplify certain graphic procedures first became evident to me at the University of Illinois Press Art Division, when I had to design and render an illustrated title page for "Space Medicine".

In 1954, he became art director for Family Weekly magazine in Chicago. In his article "Computer Graphics at Boeing" for Print magazine he wrote that he was interested in developing a computer program that could simplify the designing of the magazine in the closing stages. Together with a computer manager, he worked on the development of a program but before the project was completed, Fetter accepted employment as art director of Boeing in Wichita in 1959.

== Computer Graphics ==
=== Morphology ===
"In 1960, 'we' at Boeing coined the term computer graphics", wrote Fetter in a 1966 issue of Print magazine. In the article he wrote about the team involved. Over time, Fetter received universal credit as the first person to use the term "computer graphics". He later recognized the need to unequivocally make clear that Verne L. Hudson, his superior in the development team, used the words first. Boeing also notes that Verne L. Hudson was the first to coin the term.

In a 1966 editorial in the special "The designer and the computer" issue of Print magazine, editor Martin Fox explained the semantic difference, the meaning and interpretation of the words "graphics" and "design", as used by traditional graphic designers and designers, in contrast to how they were used by the new generation of computer graphic designers.

=== Computer Graphics ===
From the start of the 1950s, successful developments were underway in controlling machines with computers for industrial production. Subsequent development of computer aided design programs for 2D and 3D production drawings began in the mid-50s. In 1959, Fetter was recruited by Boeing as art director of the CAD department to explore creative new ideas for the production of 3D drawings.

He created a new concept of drawing perspectives. Supported by Walter Bernhardt, assistant professor of Applied Mechanics at Wichita State University, Kansas, his ideas were successfully implemented as mathematical formulae. Programmers subsequently entered these into the computer. Fetter was the team leader (supervisor) of this group. Due to the success of the first experiments, a Boeing research program was launched in November 1960 with Fetter as manager. The result of the research was registered as a "Planar Illustration Method and Apparatus" under US patent in November 1961 – Patent 1970 obtained with the number 3,519,997. The January 1965 issue of Architectural Record magazine described how Fetter had worked as a graphic designer in a team of engineers and programmers to create computer graphics.

Mr. Fetter, who is a graphic artist and not a mathematician, achieved the results he desired by describing the process of perspective drawing on a chalk board, and letting others write a computer program for the mathematically equivalent operations.

In 1963, the research department relocated from Wichita to Seattle, where Fetter became the manager of Boeing's newly founded Computer Graphics Group.

=== Human Figure ===
Fetter became well known for the creation of the first human figure in a series of computer graphics of an aeroplane pilot. In his Print magazine article he described the development of computer graphics and the human figure at Boeing. He also mentioned the need for a team of good employees for this type of project. The initial goal of the Computer Graphics Group was to use the pilot as an animation in films. The work began in 1964 and from 1966; the Human Figure was presented at conferences and lectures by Fetter. In the lectures, the film SST Cockpit Visibility simulation was shown in 1966.

The first human figure, which he managed with a computer for a film, however, was the Landing Signal Officer on a CV-A 59 aircraft carrier. The figure was shown in a short CV A-59 film but only as a silhouette and not as detailed elaboration as the First Man had been. Fetter published this in November 1964 in his book Computer Graphics in Communication in the section "Aircraft Carrier Landing Depiction with images".

==== The Portland E.A.T. Group ====
In 1965 Fetter was invited to a meeting at Bell Labs in Murray Hill, New Jersey, where he was the only one with an education in graphic and art. Participants at the meeting were Ken Knowlton and Ed Zajac of Bell Laboratories and others who conducted research on the development of computer films. Because of the travel to Bell and New York City, he learned of the Experiments in Art and Technology (E.A.T.) movement and became an active member of the group. His contacts with E.A.T. inspired him in 1968 to help found the Pacific Northwest chapter of the movement. At the founding event Fetter and Hans Graf showed the film Sorcerer's Apprentice.

== From 1969 ==
After completion of his tenure at Boeing, from 1969 to 1970 Fetter was vice-president of Graphcomp Sciences Corporation in California. He began to teach at Southern Illinois University, Carbondale, in 1970 and at the same time continued his research. He was there for two years as Head of Design. In 1977 he became director of research at Southern Illinois Research Institute (SIRIUS) in Bellevue.

Through an agreement with the Boeing Company and Computer Graphics, Inc., in 1970 Fetter was permitted to use the source code for the First Man for a 30-second TV spot. For this purpose, additional animation of the lips to move in synchronization with the text was added. This may have been the first use of a simulated human figure on TV.

Fetter died on June 23, 2002 in Bellevue, Washington.

== Exhibitions ==
The Landmark exhibitions from August 1968 to August 1969 were staged in London, New York City and in Zagreb. During both exhibitions in Zagreb, international scientific symposiums were held. Another exhibition and conference was held in Berlin. The Cybernetic Serendipity exhibition in London over the years received the most attention in secondary literature. Today, it is dependent on the nationality and education and research level of the observer as to which of the three they consider the most important. There were already critical voices about the 1968 exhibition in London. Gustav Metzger was at the Tendencies 4 symposium in Zagreb and wrote 1969 a critic in a journal by Studio International: At a time when there is a widespread concern about computers, the advertising and presentation of the I.C.A.'s ′Cybernetic Serendipity′ exhibition as a ′technological fun-fair′ is a perfectly adequate demonstration of the reactionary potential of art and technology. The Human Figure by Fetter was seen in all exhibitions as Boeing Man. In the catalog for Cybernetic Serendipity only The Boeing Computer Graphics organization is mentioned as the author.

- 1968: Cybernetic Serendipity: The Computer and the Arts, London, Institute of Contemporary Art.
- 1968: On the Path to Computer Art, MIT, und TU Berlin, Berlin.
- 1968: Some More Beginnings: An Exhibition of Submitted Works Involving Technical Materials and Processes, E.A.T., New York, Brooklyn Museum. (Note: The exhibition Some More Beginnings, 1968, was a project by the group Experiments in Art and Technology (E.A.T.), and was organized by them. The issue is rarely mentioned, but now its significance for computer art has been rediscovered.)
- 1969: Tendencija 4, Computers and Visual Research, galerija suvremene umjetnosti, Contemporary Art Gallery, Zagreb.
- 1969: Computerkunst-On the Eve of Tomorrow, Galerie Kubus, Hanover. Thereafter, in Munich, Hamburg, Oslo, Brussels, Rome and Tokyo.
- 1989: 25 Jahre Computerkunst – Grafik, Animation und Technik, BMW Pavillon, München.
- 2007: Ex Machina - Frühe Computergrafik bis 1979: Herbert W. Franke zum 80. Geburtstag, Kunsthalle Bremen, Bremen.
- 2007: bit international: [Nove] Tendencije - Neue Galerie Graz - Universalmuseum Joanneum, Graz.
- 2008: Bit International, (Nove) tendencije, 1961 bis 1973, Zagreb, In: ZKM, Medienmuseum, Karlsruhe.
- 2009: Digital Pioneers, Victoria & Albert Museum, London
- 2015: Galerija suvremene umjetnosti, Contemporary Art Gallery, Zagreb
- 2015: Tendenzen 4, Computer und Visuelle Forschung, ZKM, Karlsruhe

== Work ==
Human Figure

=== Book ===
- Computer Graphics in Communication, New York, Verlag McGraw-Hill, 1964.

=== Articles ===
- The Art Machine, In: The Journal of Commercial Art & Design, Vol. 4, No.2, Feb. 1962, p. 36.
- Computer Graphics. In 1967 University of Illinois Conference Emerging Concepts in Computer Graphics, edited by Don Secrest and Jurg Nievergelt. W.A.Benjamin, Inc., 1968, p. 397-418.
- A Computer Graphics Human Figure System Applicable to Biostereornetrics, CAD J. Fourth Int'l Con/. and Exhibition on Computers in Engineering and Building Design, IDC Science and Technology Press, Guildford, Surrey, England, 1980, coverandpp.175–179.
- A Computer Graphics Human Figure System Applicable to Kineseology, ACM Special Interest Group on Design Automation Newsletter, Vol. No.2 of 3 (late issue), June 1978, pp. 3–7.
- A Progression of Human Figures Simulated by Computer Graphics, PROCEEDINGS, SPIE, Volume 166, NATO Symposium on APPLICATIONS OF HUMAN BIOSTEREOMETRICS. July 9–13, 1978 Paris France.
- Wide Angle Displays for Tactical Situations, Proc. US Army Third Computer Graphics Workshop, Virginia Beach, Va., Apr. 1981, pp. 99–103. II. Bui-Tuong Phong, Illumination for Computer Generated Images, Comm. ACM, Vol. 18, June 1975, pp. 311–317.
- Progression of Human Figures Simulated by Computer Graphics. IEEE Computer Graphics and Applications, 1982, Vol. 2, No. 9, p. 9-13.

== Literature ==
- Herbert W. Franke: Computergraphik Computerkunst. Bruckmann, München 1971, first published.
- Herbert W. Franke: Computer Graphics Computer Art. Phaidon Press, London, Phaidon Publishers, New York, 1971. Translation by Gustav Metzger.
