= Geometry instancing =

Technique used in realtime rendering

In real-time computer graphics, geometry instancing is the practice of rendering multiple copies of the same mesh in a scene at once. This technique is primarily used for objects such as trees, grass, or buildings which can be represented as repeated geometry without appearing unduly repetitive, but may also be used for characters. Although vertex data is duplicated across all instanced meshes, each instance may have other differentiating parameters (such as color, or skeletal animation pose) changed in order to reduce the appearance of repetition.

== API support ==
Starting in Direct3D version 9, Microsoft included support for geometry instancing. This method improves the potential runtime performance of rendering instanced geometry by explicitly allowing multiple copies of a mesh to be rendered sequentially by specifying the differentiating parameters for each in a separate stream. The same functionality is available in Vulkan core, and the OpenGL core in versions 3.1 and up but may be accessed in some earlier implementations using the EXT_draw_instanced extension.

== In offline rendering ==
Geometry instancing in Houdini, Maya or other 3D packages usually involves mapping a static or pre-animated object or geometry to particles or arbitrary points in space, which can then be rendered by almost any offline renderer. Geometry instancing in offline rendering is useful for creating things like swarms of insects, in which each one can be detailed, but still behaves in a realistic way that does not have to be determined by the animator. Most packages allow variation of the material or material parameters on a per instance basis, which helps ensure that instances do not appear to be exact copies of each other. In Houdini, many object level attributes (e.g. such as scale) can also be varied on a per instance basis. Because instancing geometry in most 3D packages only references the original object, file sizes are kept very small and changing the original changes all of the instances.

In many offline renderers, such as Pixar's PhotoRealistic RenderMan, instancing is achieved by using delayed load render procedurals to only load geometry when the bucket containing the instance is actually being rendered. This means that the geometry for all the instances does not have to be in memory at once.

== Video cards that support geometry instancing ==
- GeForce 6 series and up (NV40 GPU or later)
- ATI Radeon 9500 and up (R300 GPU or later).
- PowerVR SGX535 and up (found in Apple iPhone 3GS and later)
