= 3D Core Graphics System =

The 3D Core Graphics System (a.k.a. Core) was the first graphical standard ever developed. A group of 25 experts of the ACM Special Interest Group SIGGRAPH developed this "conceptual framework". The specifications were published in 1977 and it became a foundation for many future developments in the field of computer graphics.

== See also ==
- Graphics pipeline
- Graphics library
- Graphics API
- PHIGS
