= Andrew Glassner =

American computer scientist and graphics expert

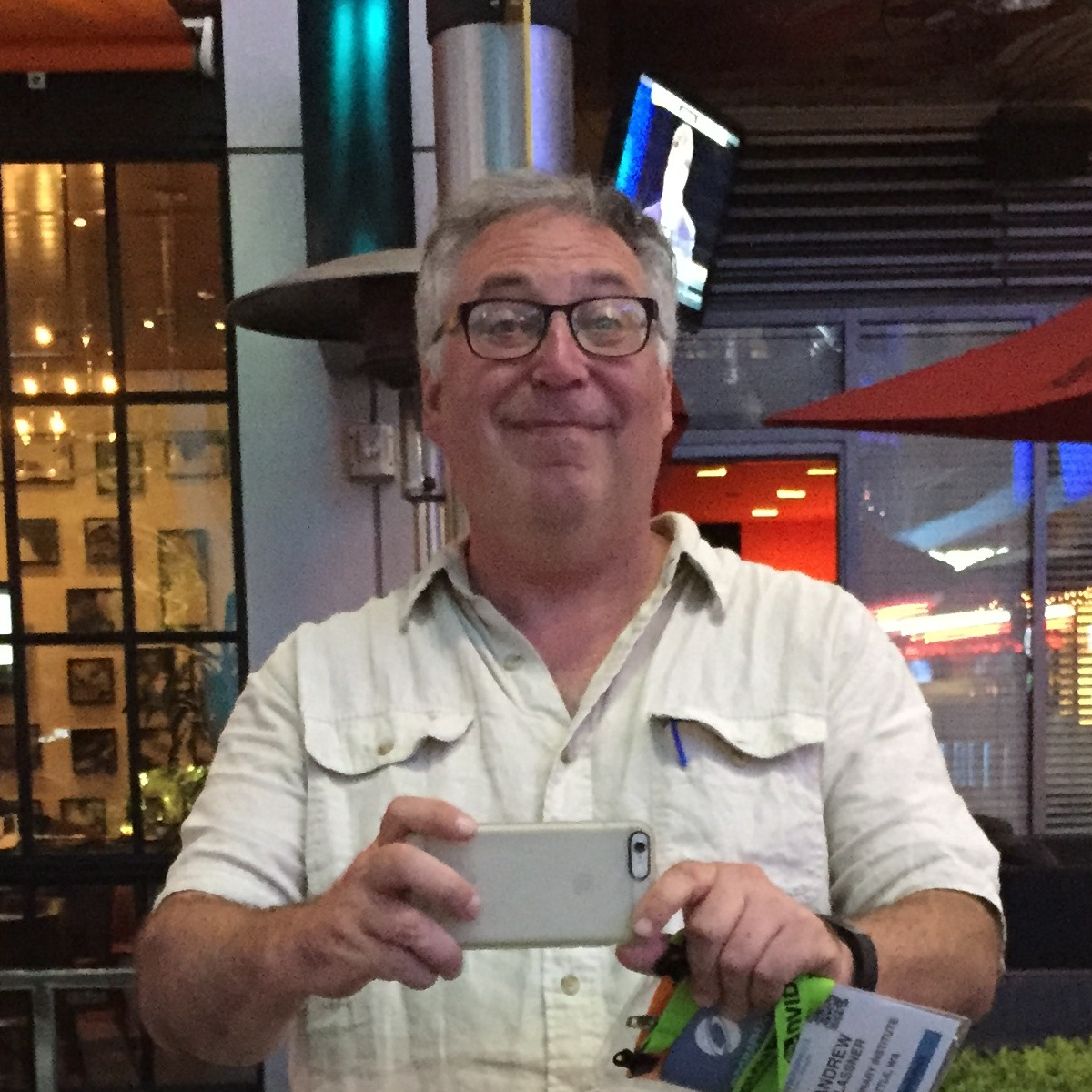
Andrew Glassner at SIGGRAPH 2015

Andrew S. Glassner (born 1960) is an American expert in computer graphics, well known in computer graphics community as the originator and editor of the Graphics Gems series, An Introduction to Ray Tracing, and Principles of Digital Image Synthesis. His later interests include interactive fiction, writing and directing and consulting in computer game and online entertainment industries. He worked at the New York Institute of Technology Computer Graphics Lab.

He started working in 3D computer graphics in 1978. He earned his B.S. in computer engineering (1984) from Case Western Reserve University, Cleveland, Ohio, M.S. in computer science (1987) and Ph.D. (1988, advisor Frederick Brooks) from the University of North Carolina at Chapel Hill, Chapel Hill, NC.

He was a researcher in computer graphics with Xerox Palo Alto Research Center (1988–1994) and with Microsoft Research (1994–2000).

His other positions include founding editor of the Journal of Graphics Tools, founding member of the advisory board of Journal of Computer Graphics Techniques, and editor-in-chief of ACM Transactions on Graphics (1995–1997). He served as Papers Chair for SIGGRAPH '94.

Since 1996 he has been writing the Andrew Glassner's Notebook column in the IEEE Computer Graphics & Applications journal, collected into three books.

In 2018 he digitally published the book Deep Learning From Basics to Practice.

In July 2019, he took up a position as senior research scientist at visual effects company Weta Digital.

== Bibliography ==
- Deep Learning From Basics to Practice, Amazon Digital Services, 2018
- Morphs, Mallards & Montagues, AK Peters Publishers, 2004, ISBN 1-56881-231-0
- Interactive Storytelling: Techniques for 21st Century Fiction, AK Peters Publishers, 2004, ISBN 1-56881-221-3
- Andrew Glassner's Third Notebook, AK Peters Publishers, 2004
- Tomorrow's Stories: The Future of Interactive Entertainment, MIT Press, Cambridge, 2003
- Andrew Glassner's Other Notebook, AK Peters Publishers, Natick, 2002
- Andrew Glassner's Notebook, Morgan-Kaufmann Publishers, San Francisco, 1999
- Principles of Digital Image Synthesis, Morgan-Kaufmann Publishers, San Francisco, 1995; author later (2011) released both volumes under Creative Commons license: Principles of Digital Image Synthesis, Version 1.01, January 19, 2011
- (Series creator and editor) Graphics Gems, Academic Press, Cambridge (volumes I through V)
- 3D Computer Graphics: A Handbook for Artists and Designers, Design Press, New York, 1989 ISBN 0-8306-1003-0 (Japanese translation 1990 by ASCII Press, Japan)
- (editor) An Introduction to Ray Tracing, Academic Press, London, 1989 (creator, editor, and multiple contributor)
- (Ph.D. thesis) Algorithms for Efficient Image Synthesis, 1988
- Computer Graphics User's Guide, Howard W. Sams & Co., Indianapolis, 1984. (Japanese translation 1987 by ASCII Press, Japan)
