= IEEE Computer Graphics and Applications =

Scientific journal

- Discipline: Computer graphics
- Language: English
- Edited by: Pak Chung Wong

Publication details
- History: 1981–present
- Publisher: IEEE Computer Society
- Frequency: Bimonthly
- Impact factor: 2.1 (2025)

Standard abbreviations
- ISO 4: IEEE Comput. Graph. Appl.

Indexing
- ISSN: 0272-1716 (print); 1558-1756 (web)
- LCCN: 81645722
- OCLC no.: 682071965

Links
- Journal homepage; Online archive

IEEE Computer Graphics and Applications (often abbreviated IEEE CG&A) is a bimonthly magazine on computer graphics published by the IEEE Computer Society since 1981. The editor-in-chief is Pak Chung Wong.

== Content ==
The magazine features shorter and less technical content than would appear in an academic journal and is meant for both experts and non-experts and often tutorial in nature. It connects the theory of computer graphics to its practice, providing coverage on topics including modeling, rendering, animation, (data) visualization, HCI/user interfaces, novel applications, hardware architectures, haptics, virtual and augmented reality systems, and medical imaging.

One of its publishing innovations was the first animated hologram to appear on a magazine cover. The hologram, on its July 1988 cover, featured the baby from the 1988 Pixar short film Tin Toy, opening and closing its mouth.

Perhaps because of its familiarity to visualization researchers, publications in the magazine have been used as a test set for works studying the visualization of citation networks. One such analysis, for an 18-year range of publications, details the most frequently cited journals, works, and authors from articles published in the magazine, and relates a factor analysis of the articles to their subtopics.

== Editors-in-chief ==
The following people have been editor-in-chief:

- 1981–1984: Michael J. Wozny
- 1985–1986: Lansing (Chip) Hatfield
- 1987–1990: John Staudhammer
- 1991–1994: Peter R. Wilson
- 1995–1998: Bertram Herzog
- 1999–2002: James J. Thomas
- 2003–2006: John C. Dill
- 2007–2009: Maureen Stone
- 2010–2013: Gabriel Taubin
- 2014–2017: Miguel Encarnação
- 2018–2022: Torsten Möller
- 2023–2024: André Stork
- 2025–present: Pak Chung Wong

== Abstracting and indexing ==
The magazine is indexed and abstracted in the following bibliographic databases:

- Academic Search Premier
- DBLP
- EBSCO databases
- Embase
- Index Medicus/MEDLINE/PubMed
- Inspec
- PASCAL
- Science Citation Index Expanded
- Scopus

According to the Journal Citation Reports, the magazine has a 2025 impact factor of 2.1.
