= List of computer graphics and descriptive geometry topics =

This is a list of computer graphics and descriptive geometry topics, by article name.

== !-9 ==
- 2D computer graphics
- 2D geometric model
- 3D computer graphics
- 3D modeling
- 3D projection
- 3D rendering

== A ==
- A-buffer
- Algorithmic art
- Aliasing
- Alpha compositing
- Alpha mapping
- Alpha to coverage
- Ambient occlusion
- Anamorphosis
- Anisotropic filtering
- Anti-aliasing
- Asymptotic decider
- Augmented reality
- Axis-aligned bounding box
- Axonometric projection

== B ==
- B-spline
- Back-face culling
- Barycentric coordinate system
- Beam tracing
- Bézier curve
- Bézier surface
- Bicubic interpolation
- Bidirectional reflectance distribution function
- Bidirectional scattering distribution function
- Bidirectional texture function
- Bilateral filter
- Bilinear interpolation
- Bin (computational geometry)
- Binary space partitioning
- Bit blit
- Bit plane
- Bitmap
- Bitmap textures
- Blend modes
- Blinn–Phong reflection model
- Bloom (shader effect)
- Bounding interval hierarchy
- Bounding sphere
- Bounding volume
- Bounding volume hierarchy
- Bresenham's line algorithm
- Bump mapping

== C ==
- Calligraphic projection
- Cel shading
- Channel (digital image)
- Checkerboard rendering
- Circular thresholding
- Clip coordinates
- Clipmap
- Clipping (computer graphics)
- Clipping path
- Collision detection
- Color depth
- Color gradient
- Color space
- Colour banding
- Color bleeding (computer graphics)
- Color cycling
- Composite Bézier curve
- Compositing
- Computational geometry
- Compute kernel
- Computer animation
- Computer art
- Computer graphics
- Computer graphics (computer science)
- Computer graphics lighting
- Computer-generated imagery
- Cone tracing
- Constructive solid geometry
- Control point (mathematics)
- Convex hull
- Cross section (geometry)
- Cube mapping
- Curvilinear perspective
- Cutaway drawing
- Cylindrical perspective

== D ==
- Data compression
- Deferred shading
- Delaunay triangulation
- Demo effect
- Depth map
- Depth peeling
- Device-independent pixel
- Diffuse reflection
- Digital art
- Digital compositing
- Digital differential analyzer (graphics algorithm)
- Digital image processing
- Digital painting
- Digital raster graphic
- Digital sculpting
- Displacement mapping
- Display list
- Display resolution
- Distance fog
- Distributed ray tracing
- Dither
- Dots per inch
- Draw distance

== E ==
- Edge detection
- Elevation
- Engineering drawing
- Environment artist
- Exploded-view drawing

== F ==
- False radiosity
- Fast approximate anti-aliasing
- Fillrate
- Flood fill
- Font rasterization
- Fractal
- Fractal landscape
- Fragment (computer graphics)
- Frame rate
- Framebuffer
- Free-form deformation
- Fresnel equations

== G ==
- Gaussian splatting
- Geometric modeling
- Geometric primitive
- Geometrical optics
- Geometry processing
- Global illumination
- Gouraud shading
- GPU
- Graph drawing
- Graphics library
- Graphics pipeline
- Graphics software
- Graphics suite

== H ==
- Heightmap
- Hemicube (computer graphics)
- Hidden-line removal
- Hidden-surface determination
- High dynamic range
- High-dynamic-range rendering

== I ==
- Image and object order rendering
- Image-based lighting
- Image-based modeling and rendering
- Image compression
- Image file format
- Image plane
- Image resolution
- Image scaling
- Immediate mode (computer graphics)
- Implicit surface
- Importance sampling
- Impossible object
- Inbetweening
- Irregular Z-buffer
- Isometric projection

== J ==
- Jaggies

== K ==
- k-d tree

== L ==
- Lambertian reflectance
- Lathe (graphics)
- Level of detail (computer graphics)
- Light field
- Light transport theory
- Lightmap
- Line clipping
- Line drawing algorithm
- Local coordinates
- Low-discrepancy sequence
- Low poly

== M ==
- Marching cubes
- Marching squares
- Marching tetrahedra
- Mask (computing)
- Mesh generation
- Metropolis light transport
- Micropolygon
- Minimum bounding box
- Minimum bounding rectangle
- Mipmap
- Monte Carlo integration
- Morph target animation
- Morphing
- Morphological antialiasing
- Motion blur
- Multiple buffering
- Multisample anti-aliasing
- Multiview orthographic projection

== N ==
- Nearest-neighbor interpolation
- Neural radiance field
- Non-photorealistic rendering
- Non-uniform rational B-spline (NURBS)
- Normal mapping

== O ==
- Oblique projection
- Octree
- On-set virtual production
- Order-independent transparency
- Ordered dithering
- Oren–Nayar reflectance model
- Orthographic projection

== P ==
- Painter's algorithm
- Palette (computing)
- Parallax mapping
- Parallax occlusion mapping
- Parallax scrolling
- Parallel projection
- Particle system
- Path tracing
- Per-pixel lighting
- Perlin noise
- Perspective (graphical)
- Perspective control
- Perspective distortion
- Phong reflection model
- Phong shading
- Photogrammetry
- Photon mapping
- Physically based rendering
- Physics engine
- Picture plane
- Pixel
- Pixel art
- Pixel-art scaling algorithms
- Pixel density
- Pixel geometry
- Point cloud
- Polygon (computer graphics)
- Polygon mesh
- Polygonal modeling
- Popping (computer graphics)
- Portal rendering
- Posterization
- Potentially visible set
- Pre-rendering
- Precomputed Radiance Transfer
- Procedural generation
- Procedural surface
- Procedural texture
- Progressive meshes
- Projection mapping
- Projection plane
- Projective geometry (for graphical projection see 3D projection)

== Q ==
- Quadtree
- Quasi-Monte Carlo method

== R ==
- Radiosity
- Raster graphics
- Raster graphics editor
- Raster image processor
- Rasterisation
- Ray casting
- Ray marching
- Ray-traced ambient occlusion
- Ray tracing
- Ray-tracing hardware
- Real-time computer graphics
- Reflection (computer graphics)
- Reflection mapping
- Relief mapping (computer graphics)
- Render farm
- Render output unit
- Rendering (computer graphics)
- Rendering equation
- Resel
- Resolution independence
- Retained mode
- Reverse perspective
- Reyes rendering
- RGB color model
- Run-length encoding

== S ==
- Scanline rendering
- Scene graph
- Scientific visualization
- Screen space ambient occlusion
- Screen space directional occlusion
- Scrolling
- Self-shadowing
- Shader
- Shading
- Shading language
- Shadow mapping
- Shadow volume
- Signed distance function
- Simplex noise
- Simulation noise
- Skeletal animation
- Skybox (video games)
- Slab method
- Soft-body dynamics
- Software rendering
- Space partitioning
- Sparse voxel octree
- Spatial anti-aliasing
- Spatial resolution
- Spatiotemporal reservoir resampling (ReSTIR)
- Specular highlight
- Specularity
- Spherical harmonic lighting
- Spline (mathematics)
- Sprite (computer graphics)
- Stencil buffer
- Stereotomy (descriptive geometry)
- Stratified sampling
- Subdivision surface
- Subpixel rendering
- Subsurface scattering
- Supersampling
- Swizzling (computer graphics)

== T ==
- T-spline
- Technical drawing
- Temporal anti-aliasing
- Tessellation (computer graphics)
- Texel (graphics)
- Texture atlas
- Texture compression
- Texture filtering
- Texture mapping
- Texture mapping unit
- Thin lens
- Tiled rendering
- Tone mapping
- Transform, clipping, and lighting
- Triangle mesh
- Triangle strip
- Trilinear filtering
- True length

== U ==
- Unbiased rendering
- Uncanny valley
- Unified shader model
- UV mapping

== V ==
- Value noise
- Vanishing point
- Vector graphics
- Vector graphics editor
- Vertex (computer graphics)
- View factor
- Viewing frustum
- Viewport
- Virtual reality
- Visual computing
- Visual effects
- Volume rendering
- Volumetric path tracing
- Voronoi diagram
- Voxel

== W ==
- Warnock algorithm
- Wire-frame model

== X ==
- Xiaolin Wu's line algorithm

== Z ==
- Z-buffering
- Z-fighting
- Z-order
- Z-order curve

== See also ==
- List of combinatorial computational geometry topics
- List of geometry topics
- List of graphical methods
- List of numerical computational geometry topics
- Glossary of computer graphics
