= Noise (spectral phenomenon) =

Types of noise

Noise is any type of random, troublesome, problematic, or unwanted signals.

Acoustic noise may mar aesthetic experience, such as attending a concert hall. It may also be a medical issue inherent in the biology of hearing.

In technology, noise is unwanted signals in a device or apparatus, commonly of an electrical nature. The nature of noise is much studied in mathematics and is a prominent topic in statistics.

This article provides a survey of specific topics linked to their primary articles.

== Acoustic noise ==
=== In transportation ===
- Aircraft noise
- Jet noise, caused by high-velocity jets and turbulent eddies
- Noise and vibration on maritime vessels
- Noise, vibration, and harshness, quality criteria for vehicles
- Traffic noise, including roadway noise and train noise

=== Other acoustic noise ===
- Artificial noise, in spectator sports
- Background noise, in acoustics, any sound other than the monitored one
- Comfort noise, used in telecommunications to fill silent gaps
- Grey noise, random noise with a psychoacoustic adjusted spectrum
- Industrial noise, relevant to hearing damage and industrial hygiene
- Noise pollution, that affects negatively the quality of life

== Noise in biology ==
- Cellular noise, in biology, random variability between cells
- Developmental noise, variations among living beings with the same genome
- Neuronal noise, in neuroscience
- Synaptic noise, in neuroscience
- Transcriptional noise, in biochemistry, errors in genetic transcription

== Noise in computer graphics ==
Noise in computer graphics refers to various pseudo-random functions used to create textures, including:

- Gradient noise, created by interpolation of a lattice of pseudorandom gradients
  - Perlin noise, a type of gradient noise developed in 1983
- Simplex noise, a method for constructing an n-dimensional noise function comparable to Perlin noise
- Simulation noise, a function that creates a divergence-free field
- Value noise, created by interpolation of a lattice of pseudorandom values; differs from gradient noise
- Wavelet noise, an alternative to Perlin noise which reduces problems of aliasing and detail loss
- Worley noise, a noise function introduced by Steven Worley in 1996

== Noise in electronics and radio ==
- Noise (signal processing), various types of interference
  - Noise (electronics), related to electronic circuitry
    - Ground noise, appearing at the ground terminal of audio equipment
  - Image noise, related to digital photography
  - Noise (radio), interference related to radio signals
    - Atmospheric noise, radio noise caused by lightning
    - Cosmic noise, radio noise from outside the Earth's atmosphere
  - Noise (video), "snow" on video or television pictures

== Noise in mathematics ==
- Any one of many statistical types or colors of noise, such as
  - White noise, which has constant power spectral density
  - Gaussian noise, with a probability density function equal to that of the normal distribution
  - Pink noise, with spectral density inversely proportional to frequency
  - Brownian noise or "brown" noise, with spectral density inversely proportional to the square of frequency
- Pseudorandom noise, in cryptography, artificial signal that can pass for random
- Statistical noise, a colloquialism for recognized amounts of unexplained variation in a sample
- Shot noise, noise which can be modeled by a Poisson process
- Noise-based logic, where logic values are different stochastic processes
- Noise print, a statistical signature of ambient noise, used in its suppression

== Other types of noise ==
- Electrochemical noise, electrical fluctuations in electrolysis, corrosion, etc.
- Phonon noise, in materials science
- Seismic noise, random tremors of the ground

== Measures of noise intensity ==
- Noise figure, the ratio of the output noise power to attributable thermal noise
- Ambient noise level, the background sound pressure level at a given location
- Noise power, with several related meanings
- Noise spectral density, N_{o} measured in Watt/Hertz
- Noise temperature, temperature that would produce equivalent semiconductor noise

== See also ==
- Noise (disambiguation)
