= Procedural generation =

Method in which data is created algorithmically as opposed to manually

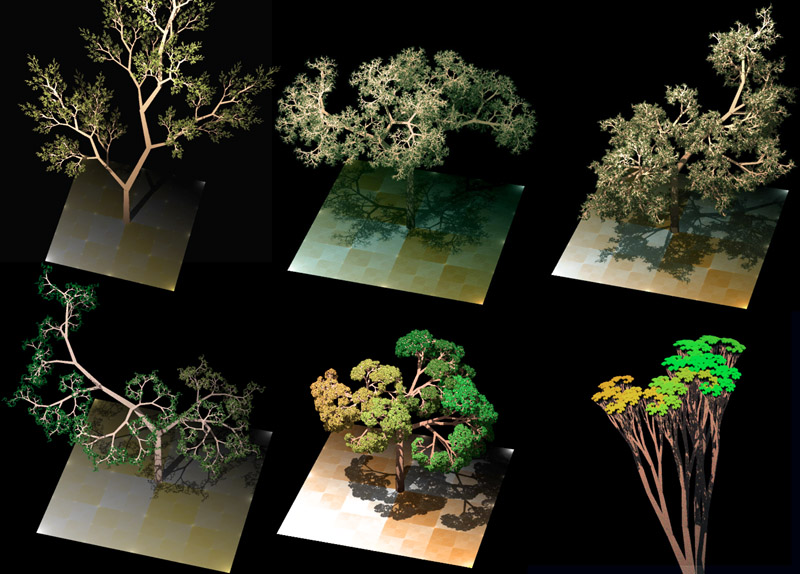
One example of procedural generation, here using L-systems to generate realistic looking tree models. Different models can be generated by changing both deterministic parameters and a random seed.

In computing, procedural generation is a method of creating data algorithmically as opposed to manually, typically through a combination of human-generated content and algorithms coupled with computer-generated randomness and processing power. In computer graphics, it is commonly used to create textures and 3D models. In video games, it is used to automatically create large amounts of content in a game. Depending on the implementation, advantages of procedural generation can include smaller file sizes, larger amounts of content, and randomness for less predictable gameplay.

== Overview ==
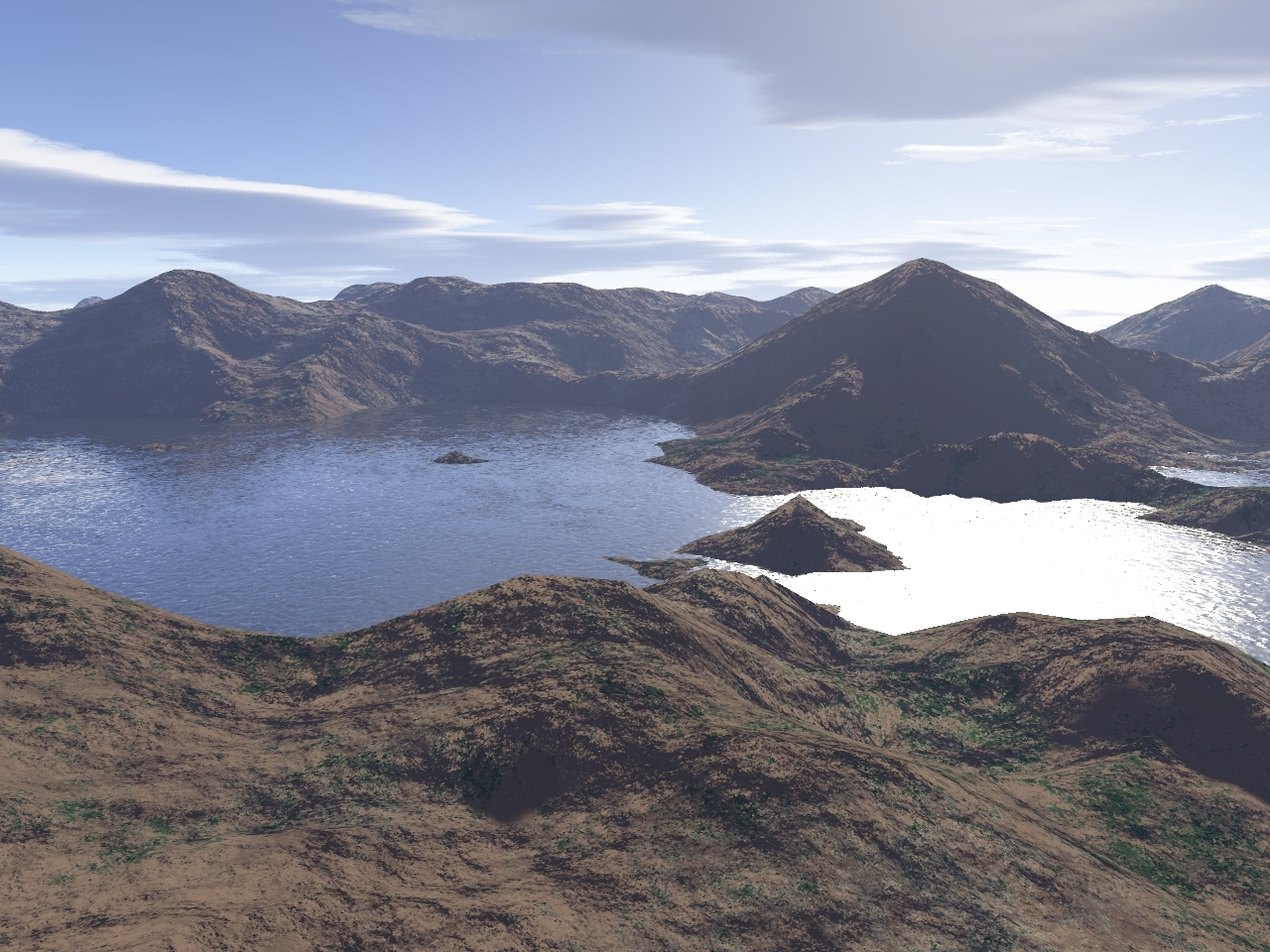
A procedural landscape rendered in Terragen

The term procedural refers to the process that computes a particular function. Fractals are geometric patterns which can often be generated procedurally. Commonplace procedural content includes textures and meshes. Sound is often also procedurally generated, and has applications in both speech synthesis as well as music. It has been used to create compositions in various genres of electronic music by artists such as Brian Eno who popularized the term "generative music".

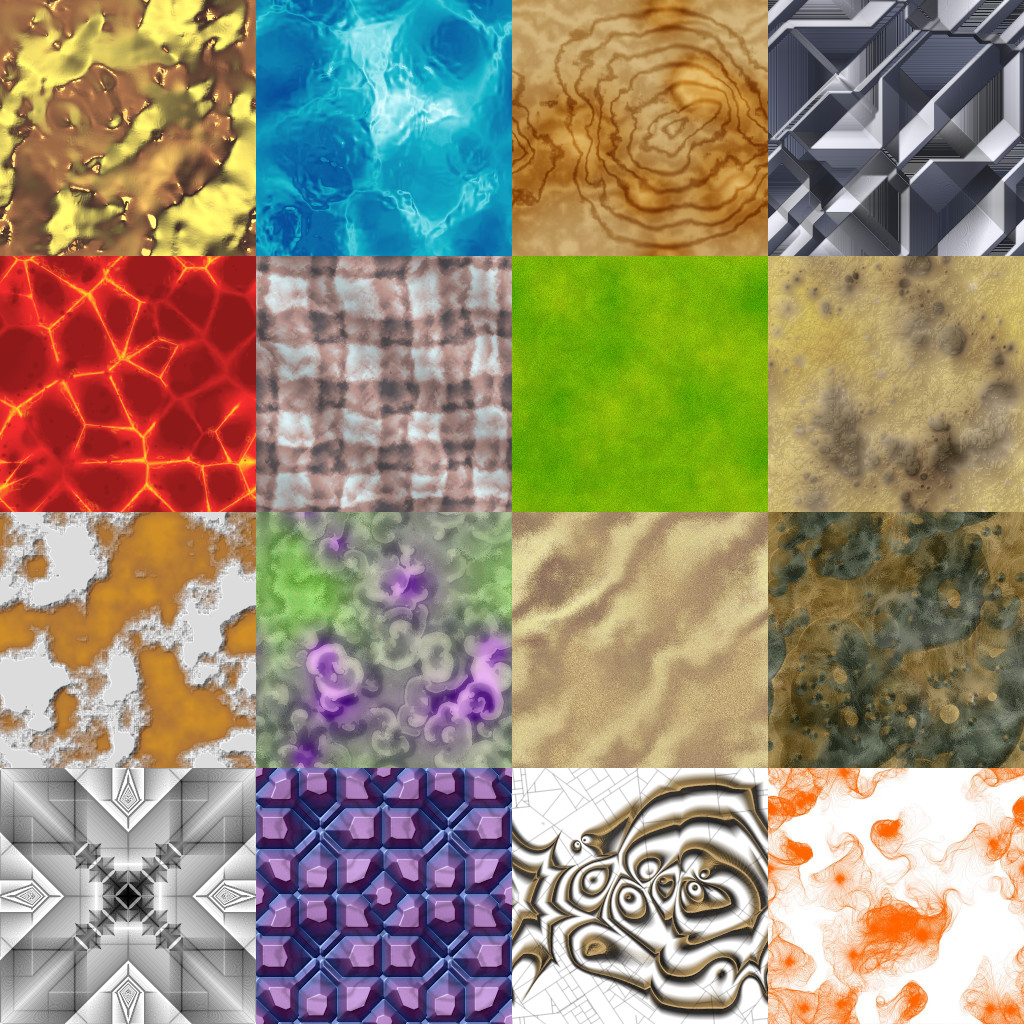
Procedurally generated textures

Procedural generation was originally created as an instrument for video games, aiding in generating levels, textures and complete worlds with little human contribution. Procedurally generated elements have appeared in video games since the 1990s: The Elder Scrolls II: Daggerfall takes place in a mostly procedurally generated world, giving a world roughly two thirds the actual size of the British Isles. Soldier of Fortune from Raven Software uses simple routines to detail enemy models, while its sequel featured a randomly generated level mode. Avalanche Studios employed procedural generation to create a large and varied group of detailed tropical islands for Just Cause. No Man's Sky, a game developed by games studio Hello Games, is all based upon procedurally generated elements.

The modern demoscene uses procedural generation to package a great deal of audiovisual content into relatively small programs.

New methods and applications are presented annually in conferences such as the IEEE Conference on Computational Intelligence and Games and the AAAI Conference on Artificial Intelligence and Interactive Digital Entertainment.

Particularly in the application of procedural generation with video games, which are intended to be highly replayable, there are concerns that procedural systems can generate infinite numbers of worlds to explore, but without sufficient human guidance and rules to guide these. The result has been called "procedural oatmeal", a term coined by writer Kate Compton, in that while it is possible to mathematically generate thousands of bowls of oatmeal with procedural generation, they will be perceived to be the same by the user, and lack the notion of perceived uniqueness that a procedural system should aim for.

== In tabletop role-playing games ==
Using procedural generation in games had origins in tabletop role playing games (RPG). The leading tabletop system, Advanced Dungeons & Dragons, provided ways for the "dungeon master" to generate dungeons and terrain using random die rolls, expanded in later editions with complex branching procedural tables. Strategic Simulations under license from TSR released the Dungeon Master's Assistant, a computer program that generated dungeons based on these published tables. Tunnels & Trolls, published by Flying Buffalo, was designed primarily around solitary play and used similar procedural generation for its dungeons. Other tabletop RPGs borrowed similar concepts in procedural generation for various world elements.

Many online tools for Dungeon Masters now use procedural generation to varying degrees.

== In video games ==
=== Early history ===
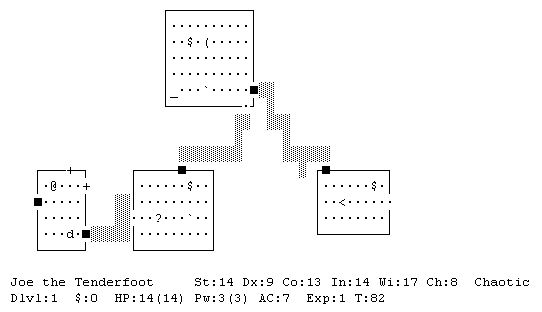
A procedurally generated dungeon map in the video game NetHack

Prior to graphically oriented video games, roguelike games, a genre directly inspired by Dungeons & Dragons adopted for solitary play, heavily utilized procedural generation to randomly produce dungeons, in the same manner that tabletop systems had done. Such early games include Beneath Apple Manor (1978) and the genre's namesake, Rogue (1980). The procedural generation system in roguelikes would create dungeons in ASCII- or regular tile-based systems and define rooms, hallways, monsters, and treasure to challenge the player. Roguelikes, and games based on the roguelike concepts, allow the development of complex gameplay without having to spend excessive time in creating a game's world.

1978's Maze Craze for the Atari VCS used an algorithm to generate a random, top-down maze for each game.

Some games used pseudorandom number generators. These PRNGs were often used with predefined seed values in order to generate very large game worlds that appeared to be premade. The map seed is a (relatively) short number or text string which is used to procedurally create the game world ("map"). This means that while the seed-unique generated map may be many megabytes in size (often generated incrementally and virtually unlimited in potential size), it is possible to reset to the unmodified map, or the unmodified map can be exchanged between players, just by specifying the map seed.

The Sentinel supposedly had 10,000 different levels stored in only 48 and 64 kilobytes. An extreme case was Elite, which was originally planned to contain a total of 2^{48} (approximately 282 trillion) galaxies with 256 solar systems each. However, the publisher was afraid that such a gigantic universe would cause disbelief in players, and eight of these galaxies were chosen for the final version. Other notable early examples include the 1985 game Rescue on Fractalus (that used fractals to procedurally create, in real time, the craggy mountains of an alien planet) and River Raid (the 1982 Activision game that used a pseudorandom number sequence generated by a linear feedback shift register in order to generate a scrolling maze of obstacles).

=== Modern use ===
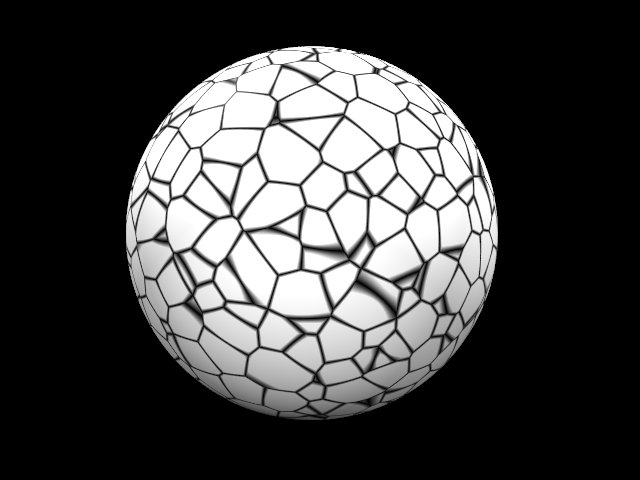
Procedural texture using Voronoi tessellation

The "new game" screen in Factorio. In addition to specifying the map seed itself, Factorio can also encode all the map settings into a single map exchange string.

Though modern computer games do not have the same memory and hardware restrictions that earlier games had, the use of procedural generation is frequently employed to create randomized games, maps, levels, characters, or other facets that are unique on each playthrough.

Many modern roguelike games (sometimes referred to as "roguelites") have shifted away from the turn-based early roguelikes to incorporate gameplay of other video game genres, such as platformers or shoot 'em ups, though still retain elements of procedural generation in how gameplay maps and levels are generated to assure that the player has a means to complete each level along with permadeath. This also extends to power-ups and other items that populate the game's map, selected by the game through procedural generational rules to assure the game feels fair to the player so they feel they have the agency to win the game.

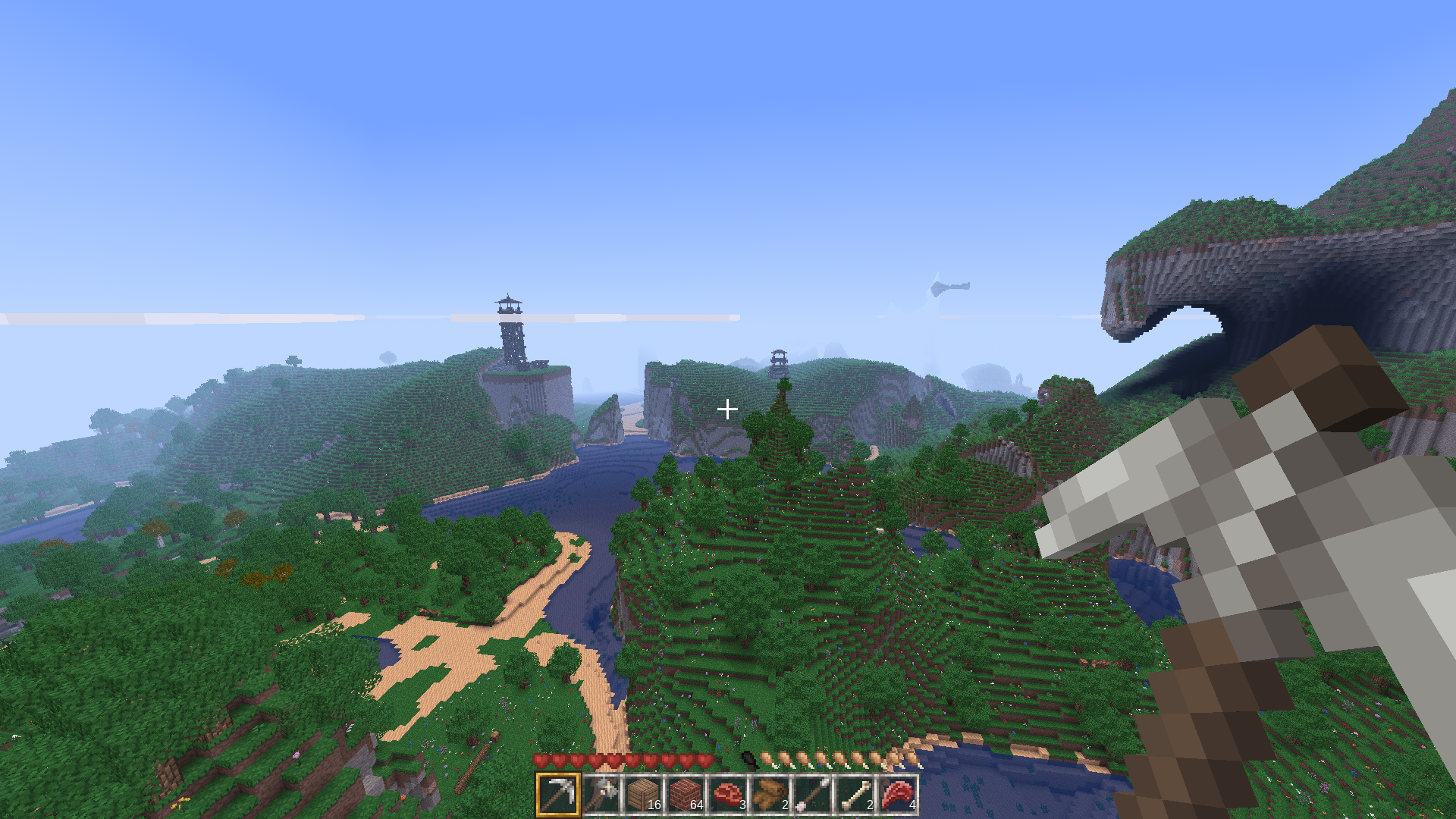
Procedurally generated voxel-based terrain in Luanti using the VoxeLibre game

Procedural generation is often used in loot systems of quest-driven games, such as action role-playing games and massive multiplayer online role playing games. Though quests may feature fixed rewards, other loot, such as weapons and armor, may be generated for the player based on the player-character's level, the quest's level, their performance in the quest, and other random factors. This often leads to loot having a rarity quality applied to reflect when the procedural generation system has produced an item with better-than-average attributes. For example, the Borderlands series is based on its procedural generation system which can create over a million unique guns and other equipment. Many open world or survival games procedurally create a game world from a random seed or one provided by the player, so that each playthrough is different. These generation systems create numerous pixel- or voxel-based biomes with distribution of resources, objects, and creatures. The player frequently has the ability to adjust some of the generation parameters, such as specifying the amount of water coverage in a world. Examples of such games include Dwarf Fortress, Minecraft, and Vintage Story.

Procedural generation is also used in space exploration and trading games. Elite: Dangerous, through using the 400 billion known stars of the Milky Way Galaxy as its world basis, uses procedural generation to simulate the planets in these solar systems. Similarly, Star Citizen uses the technology to create seamlessly loaded planets among its hand-crafted universe. Outerra Anteworld is a video game in development that uses procedural generation and real world data to create a virtual replica of planet Earth in true scale.

No Man's Sky, by using procedural generation, is the largest video game in history, featuring a universe of 18 quintillion planets across entire galaxies, which can be explored in flight or on foot. The planets all have their own uniquely diverse terrain, weather, flora, and fauna, as well as a number of space-faring alien species. The same content exists at the same places for all players (thanks to a single random seed number to their deterministic engine), which enables players to meet and share discoveries.

Games which use procedural generation and include support for setting the map seed include Ark: Survival Evolved, Minecraft, Factorio, SCP – Containment Breach, and Terraria. For Minecraft especially, there are websites and articles, dedicated to sharing seeds which have been found to generate interesting maps.

The effect of loading a map originally generated in Minecraft 1.6.4 in Minecraft 1.7.2. The map seed is unchanged, but the map generation algorithm has changed, leading to a discontinuity where new chunks are created beside old chunks.

The map seed only has meaning in the context of the algorithm used to generate the map (often based on Perlin noise). So if the map generation algorithm changes, the map generated by a given seed will also change. Such changes are particularly obvious in Minecraft, where they are handled (or rather, not handled) by simply generating any newly explored chunks of an existing map using the new algorithm, leading to obvious and jarring discontinuities after upgrading.

Favorable seeds can be used when speedrunning video games by specifying the map seed manually.

=== Advantages and disadvantages ===
One advantage of procedural generation is that it allows the creation of large or theoretically infinite worlds with little computational or budget requirement. Minecraft features a procedurally generated voxel world that, although can theoretically generate infinitely, has an artificial impassable border at 30 million meters from world center to prevent distance effects caused by floating point precision loss. A Minecraft world has a surface area of 3.6 billion square kilometers, seven times the total surface area of Earth. Each map's random seed is a 64-bit integer, meaning there are 18 quintillion ($2^{64}$) possible maps. Fuel (2009) uses procedural terrain generation alongside man-made objects and landmarks, allowing over 12,900 square kilometers to be generated and stored efficiently. Creating such worlds by hand would require significant effort and budget, while storing them with traditional methods would require infeasible amounts of storage.

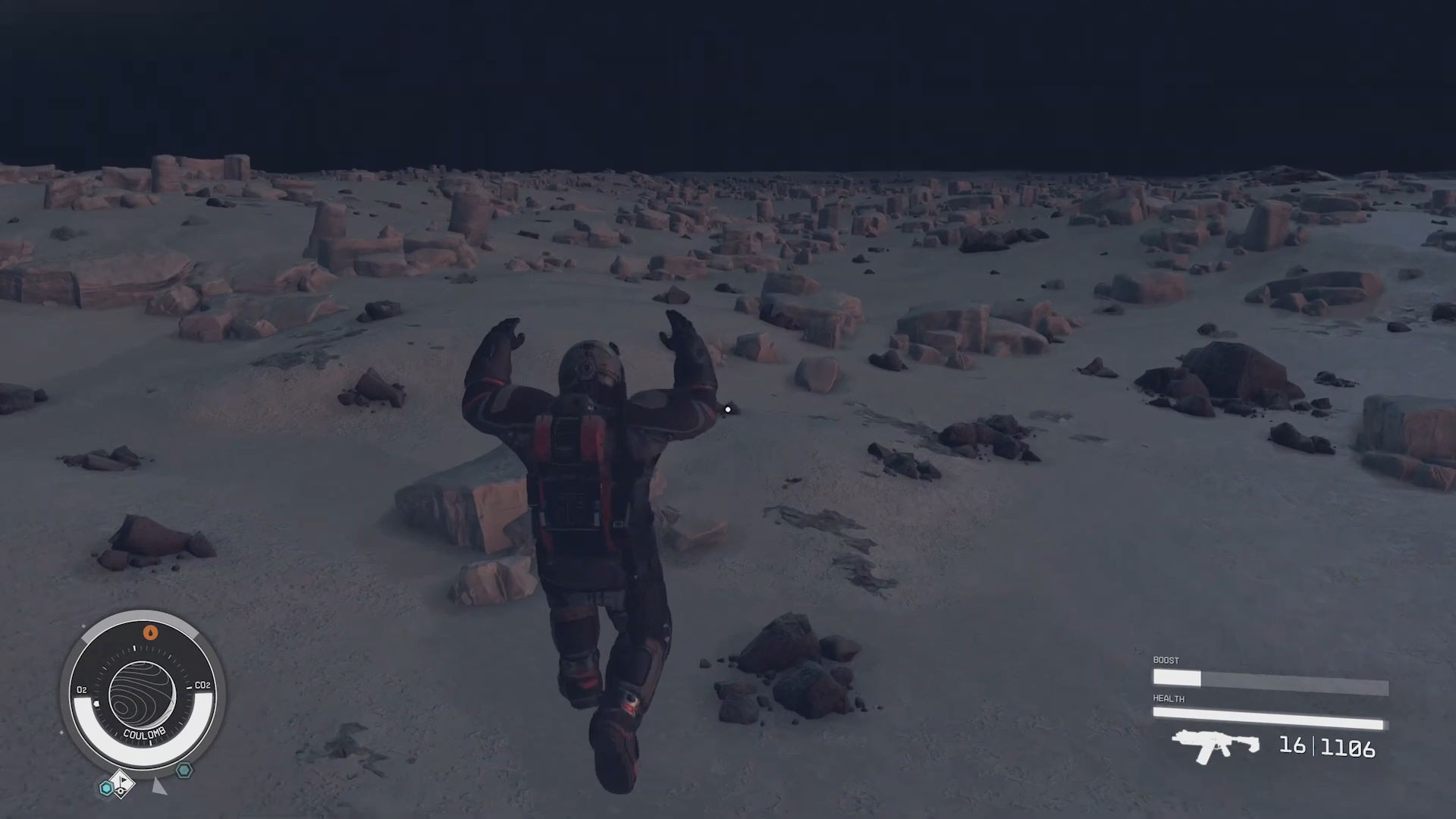
Planets in Starfield were criticized for their sparse terrain and repeated structure layouts.

Most procedural generation algorithms can only use a fixed amount of parameters and assets, leading to repetition. While No Man's Sky's world generation algorithms received praise for its technical ingenuity, they were also criticized for their monotonous nature. Reviewers similarly criticized Starfield for having barren landscapes and repeating point of interest layouts down to individual item placements on most of the game's over 1,000 planets. Additionally, making the worlds too large may result in graphical, physics and terrain glitches at long distances due to floating point precision loss that become progressively more severe the further the player gets away from the center, though this can be avoided by using the floating origin technique.

== In other areas ==
As in video games, procedural generation is often used in film to create visually interesting and accurate spaces rapidly. This comes in a wide variety of applications.

One application is imperfect factories, which are used by artists to rapidly generate many similar objects. This accounts for the fact that, in real life, no two objects are ever exactly alike. For instance, an artist can model a product for a grocery store, and then create an imperfect factory to generate many imperfect copies to populate a whole shelf.

MASSIVE is a high-end computer animation and artificial intelligence software package used for generating crowd-related visual effects for film and television. It was developed to create fighting armies of hundreds of thousands of soldiers for Peter Jackson's The Lord of the Rings films automatically.

Coherent noise can be extremely important to procedural workflow in film. Simplex noise is often faster with fewer artifacts, though an older function called Perlin noise may be used as well. Coherent noise, in this case, refers to a function that generates smooth pseudo-randomness in n dimensions.

Poyck studied how procedurally generated cityscapes can be used to aid social simulations and to train self-driving cars.

Procedural generation plays a pivotal part in the progression of digital twins, which are very detailed virtual replicas of real-world objects used for simulation, analysis, and planning.

== Future directions ==
Neural networks have recently been employed to refine procedurally generated content. Combining classic randomization methods with deep learning provides new ways for generating audio, images, 3D objects, and other content types. This is especially useful in game level development; reinforcement learning allows the development of agents that play generated levels, serving as automatic content evaluators.

Integrating procedural generation with deep learning alters the landscape of digital content creation. Zakaria et al. demonstrated that different deep learning methods for procedurally generating Sokoban levels have different strengths and weaknesses.

Looking ahead, researchers are investigating methods to combine large language models (LLMs) with deep-learning powered procedural generation systems, aiming to enhance their adaptability. Zakaria suggests that "LLMs combined with reinforcement learning can create procedural assets that evolve dynamically based on real-time feedback". Zakaria investigated the application of advanced deep learning structures such as bootstrapped LSTM (Long short-term memory) generators and GANs (Generative adversarial networks) to upgrade procedural level design. They found that "diversity sampling consistently increases the numbers of generated solutions and signatures", showing that hybrid approaches help overcome problems like repetitive patterns or lack of variation.

== See also ==
- Cellular automaton – Discrete model of computation
- Computational creativity – Multidisciplinary endeavour
- Fractal landscape – Stochastically generated naturalistic terrain
- Fractional Brownian motion – Probability theory concept
- Generative art – Art created by a set of rules, often using computers
- Generative AI – AI that generates content
- L-system – Rewriting system and type of formal grammar
- Linear congruential generator – Algorithm for generating pseudo-randomized numbers
- List of games using procedural generation
- Noise (spectral phenomenon) – Types of noise
- Perlin noise – Type of gradient noise in computer graphics
- Procedural animation – Type of computer animation
- Procedural modeling – Class of techniques in computer graphics
- Procedural texture – Computer graphics textures that are generated procedurally
- Roguelike – Subgenre of role-playing video games
- Scenery generator – Type of software
- Simplex noise – Construction for n-dimensional noise functions
- Synthetic media – Artificial production of media by automated means
