= OpenSimplex noise =

N-dimensional gradient noise function

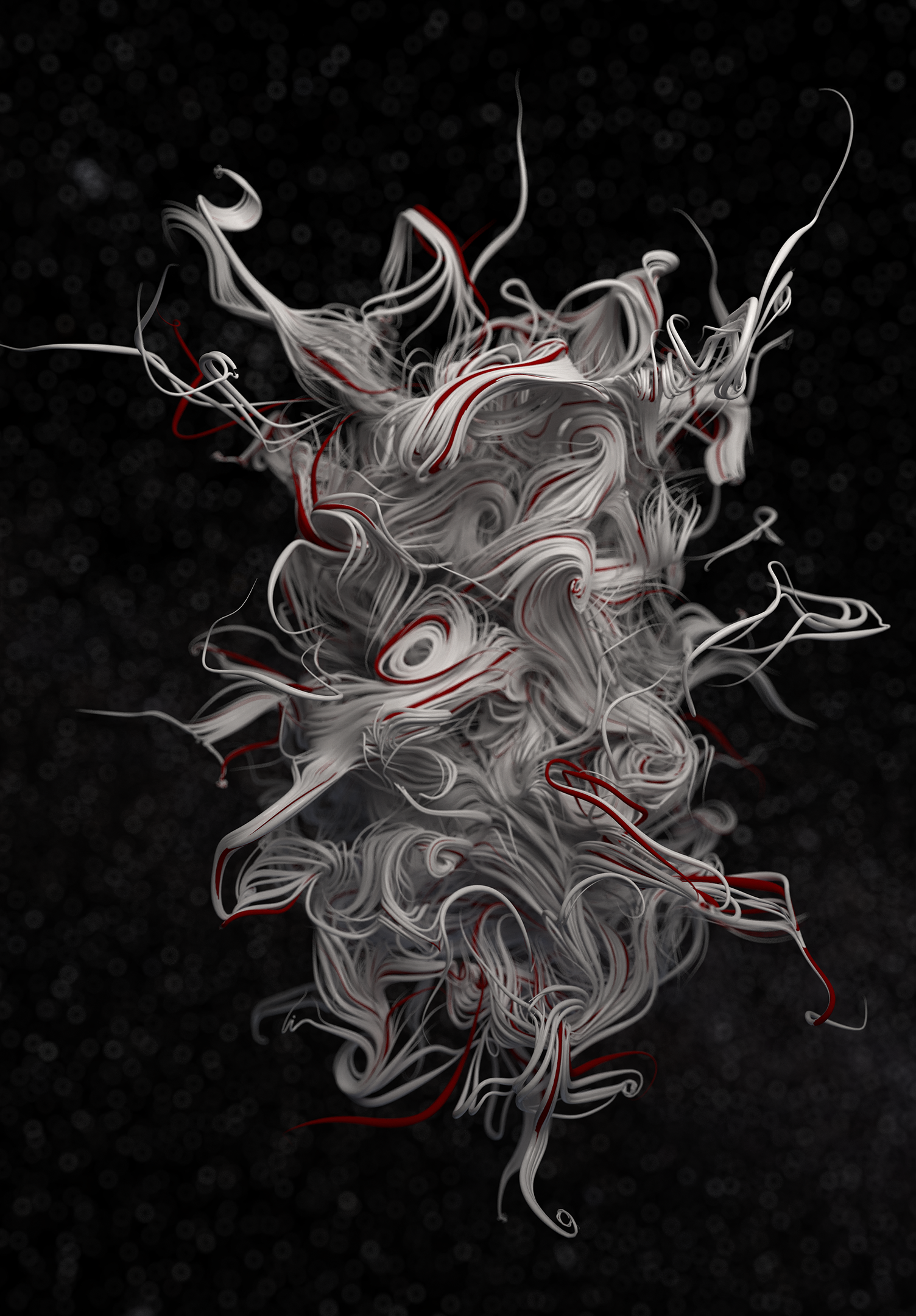
Abstract composition in 3D generated with the OpenSimplex noise generation algorithm.

OpenSimplex noise is an n-dimensional (up to 4D) gradient noise function that was developed by Kurt Spencer in 2014 in order to overcome the patent-related issues surrounding simplex noise, while likewise avoiding the visually-significant directional artifacts characteristic of Perlin noise.

The algorithm shares numerous similarities with simplex noise, but has two primary differences:

- Whereas simplex noise starts with a hypercubic honeycomb and squashes it down the main diagonal in order to form its grid structure, OpenSimplex noise instead swaps the skew and inverse-skew factors and uses a stretched hypercubic honeycomb. The stretched hypercubic honeycomb becomes a simplicial honeycomb after subdivision. This means that 2D Simplex and 2D OpenSimplex both use different orientations of the triangular tiling, but whereas 3D Simplex uses the tetragonal disphenoid honeycomb, 3D OpenSimplex uses the tetrahedral-octahedral honeycomb.
- OpenSimplex noise uses a larger kernel size than simplex noise. The result is a smoother appearance at the cost of performance, as additional vertices need to be determined and factored into each evaluation.

OpenSimplex has a variant called "SuperSimplex" (or OpenSimplex2S), which is visually smoother. "OpenSimplex2F" is identical to the original SuperSimplex.

== See also ==
- Value noise
- Worley noise
