= Egor (software) =

Egor The Animator
- Developer: Sausage Software
- Release: February 6, 1996
- Final release: 3.4
- Operating system: Windows 95
- Type: Computer animation
- License: Shareware

Egor (also called Egor the Animator) was an early computer animation program for making animations in Java released by Sausage Software on February 6, 1996, as the first commercial Java applet. The software allowed for the creation of animated graphics with sounds to be deployed as a Java applet for use through a web browser. Egor featured a user-friendly interface, tutorials, and sample images and designed for use by non programmers with minimal knowledge of HTML. The software is named after Igor, the mad scientist.

Egor used non-standard HTML tags which were meant to be used with Netscape 2. Egor was designed for use with Netscape as Internet Explorer did not fully support Java at the time.

Egor is no longer supported or sold by Sausage Software.

== Features ==
The program allowed creation of animations by specifying a sequence of images. The animations could have sounds associated with them. Egor also supported uploading files.

The program created Java animations for Netscape 2.

== Reception ==
Egor had mixed reception. It was described as "fast and flexible" though it suffered from bugs as the Java SDK was not stable at the time. Egor had 5 cows from Tucows.

== Versions ==
"There has been a lot of talk about Java across the world. It was the company commitment of time and resources to develop the language that has enabled us to claim this important world first, proving we are at the cutting edge of Web programming and products"
—Steve Outtrim, Sausage Software.

Egor was a 32-bit application written for Windows 95 released in February 6, 1996. Fourthnet, the European distributor for HotDog, began marketing all of Sausage Software's software including Egor in June 1996. Version 3 was released on September 10, 1996 and allowed for multiple sprites, sprite collision, and mouse over events. The 32-bit edition originally sold for US$99.95 (equivalent to $200.46 in 2025) with the upgrade price being US$30 (equivalent to $60.17 in 2025).

When purchased on a CD-ROM, Egor was bundled with a trial edition of Hot Dog Professional, PaintShop Pro, Sound Gadget Pro, the EarthLink Network TotalAccess membership kit and the Netscape Navigator browser.

Egor Releases
Version	Date	Size (in kb)	Download	Notes
1	February 9, 1996	?	?	
3	September 10, 1996	?	?	

Egor was also available at Tucows. Download versions came with a 14-day evaluation period.

== Notes ==
Books

- Brown, Nicola; Peter Chen; David Miller; Paul Van Eyk; William E. Weinman (1996). Designing Web Animation. Indianapolis, Ind.: New Riders Pub. ISBN 978-1-56205-647-6.
