= Filter Forge =

Computer graphics program

- Original author: Filter Forge Inc.
- Developer: Filter Forge OÜ
- Initial release: March 5, 2007; 18 years ago
- Stable release: Filter Forge 12.006 / November 24, 2022; 3 years ago
- Written in: C++
- Operating system: Microsoft Windows, MacOS
- Website: www.filterforge.com

Filter Forge is a computer graphics program for Windows and Mac that allows users to create procedural textures and modify images. It can be used as a standalone application or as a plugin for compatible 8bf hosts such as Adobe Photoshop, Affinity Photo, Corel PaintShop Pro. It has been under continuous development by Filter Forge OÜ (formerly Filter Forge, Inc) since its official release in March 2007.

Filter Forge renders images based on input images and XML documents called "filters". A filter (not to be confused with a mathematical filter) is essentially a tree of successive generations and/or transformations of color and position. Types of generations include single colors, polygons, gradients, Perlin noise, variations of Worley noise, and patterns commonly found in masonry. Types of transformations include rotation, scaling, refraction, noise distortion, kaleidoscope patterns, blurs, edge detection, blending, a variety of color space manipulations, and switches. As of version 4.0xx, the program also implements floating point processing, particle arrays, recursive loops, bézier curves, and built-in Lua scripting. Filter Forge also includes rendering options such as anti-aliasing, bump maps and normal maps, environment mapping, ambient occlusion, seamless tiling, and a text-based batch renderer. Users can randomize or control specific parameters of each filter through sliders, color pickers, and checkboxes. Sets of parameter values can be saved as presets.

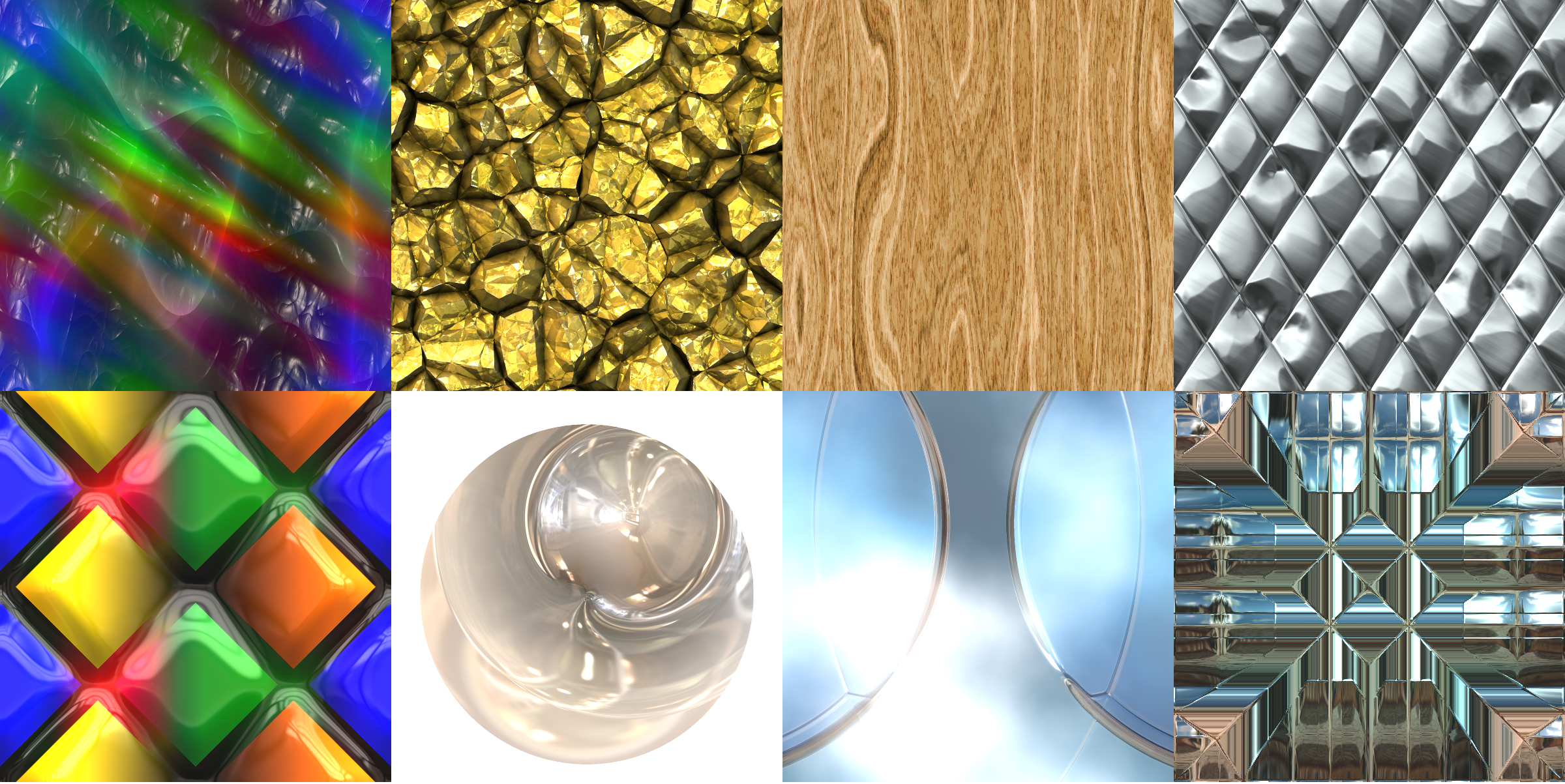
Eight textures created by using the software program Filter Forge - art glass, raw gold, wood, damaged metal siding from a hot dog cart, an Art Deco-inspired abstract texture, a pearl, spaceship glass, and another abstract texture inspired by New York City luxury architecture.

While it is possible to edit filters with any text editor, Filter Forge includes a visual node-based filter editor. In the editor window, components are placed on a workspace and connected to one another like blocks in a flowchart. Similar editors exist in other computer graphics applications such as Genetica, DarkTree, and Substance Designer.

Filter Forge hosts a web-based library of thousands of user-submitted filters that can be previewed and downloaded online or using the program's built-in browser. It maintains this model by offering a time-limited demo and rewards to authors of highly used library filters. Renders of library filters are available to anyone for free, but the program is needed to modify the filters and their parameters.

== See also ==
- Procedural texture
