= FrameGang =

- FrameGang in Windows 95
- Developer: Sausage Software
- Release: April 6, 1996
- Final release: 1.051 / April 1996; 30 years ago
- Written in: Microsoft Visual Basic 4.0 (Note: FrameGang requires "VB40032.DLL" to run. Vb40032.dll is the run-time engine used by applications developed in Microsoft Visual Basic version 4.0 32-bit. See Vb4Run.exe Run-Time .dlls for Visual Basic 4.0 Apps at Microsoft for more information.)
- Operating system: Windows 3.1, Windows 3.11, Windows 95
- Platform: Windows
- Size: FrameGang 32: 2.17MB; FrameGang 16: 1.68MB
- Available in: English
- Type: HTML editor
- License: Proprietary
- Website: www.sausage.com/framgang.htm (offline)

FrameGang was an applet for developing HTML frames for Netscape released by Sausage Software in April 1996. The program featured a drag-and-drop interface that allowed users to define the number, size and position of the HTML frames without knowledge of HTML. It was one of the four "snaglets" along with Crosseye, Flash, and Clickette that were released by Sausage Software that month.

FrameGang used non-standard HTML tags which were meant to be used with Netscape, and thus not all browsers were able to use the frames created.

FrameGang is no longer for sale by Sausage Software.

== Features ==
FrameGang could handle multiple frames, allowed previewing and saving of the frames, and generated HTML code for the frames which could then be used in HotDog. FrameGang allowed for the development of frames without knowledge of html. (Note: In the FrameGang "fghelp" file in version 1a, it states "FrameGang shields you from having to know about frame HTML syntax." under the 'Jargon Buster' section.) The program was also accompanied with help features and tutorials on building frames.

FrameGang was considered an "addon" to Sausage Software's popular HotDog Professional 2.0 which didn't have frame support.

== Reception ==
FrameGang was well received and was recommended in PC/Computing magazine's list of "1,001 Top Free Internet Downloads" for 1997.

"FrameGang is an excellent way to create Netscape frames for HTML documents."

— ZD Net Software Library, 13 May 1996.

"Some of us want to get down and dirty with HTML tags and some of us don't, and the lowest and dirtiest tags currently about would probably be those dealing with frames. To avoid the agony (or ecstasy if you enjoy this sort of thing), use FrameGang."

— Australian Net Guide

It was also praised for its ease of use and in-depth tutorials on HTML frames.

FrameGang was recommended for those using Netscape Navigator Gold 3 which didn't yet support frame development even though the Netscape Navigator browser did support frames.

== Frame Gang ==
Frame gang (left to right): X, Gus, Vin, Joe, Stan

The frame gang is used in the FrameGang Help file to represent different section graphically. The frame gang consists of 5 members: X, Gus, Vin, Joe, Stan. Several members also had a slogan. (Note: In the FrameGang "fghelp" file in version 1a, it uses the various FrameGang members throughout the help file.)

- Gus-Represents "advanced information". Slogan: I'm Gus...look at me when I'm talkin!
- Vin- Shown in the splash screen, and used in the icon.
- Joe - Represents the "basic information" about FrameGang. Slogan: I'm Joe...whadda you lookin at!
- Stan- Represents "more answers". Slogan: Hello I'm Stan!

When creating new frames, a member of the frame gang would initially fill up that frame.

== Editions ==
FrameGang was a 32-bit application written for Windows 95 released in April 1996. Fourthnet, the European distributor for HotDog, began marketing all of Sausage Software's snaglets including FrameGang in June 1996. A 16-bit version for Windows 3.1 was released on December 17, 1996, along with 16-bit versions of Dummy, Gatling, and Bandwidth Buster. The 32-bit edition originally sold for US$50/A$70, but the price was later reduced to US$25/£25 on May 22, 1996. (Note: In the FrameGang "fghelp" file in version 1a, it lists the price for FrameGang as US$50 and A$70 under the 'I want to order...pronto!' section.)

FrameGang was also available at tucows.

== System requirements ==
FrameGang had the following system requirements: (Note: In the FrameGang "fghelp" file "FrameGang Help V1.41", it list system requirements under 'Frequently Asked Questions' under question "What's the minimum system configuration I can use?")

- IBM-Compatible PC
- Processor: 80486 DX 33 or better
- Operating system: Windows 3.1 / 3.11 / 95/ Windows NT 3.51/Windows NT Server 3.51
- RAM: 8MB minimum, 16MB recommended
- Computer mouse

== See also ==
- Frame-IT!
- FrameMaker
