= Value noise =

Type of noise in computer graphics

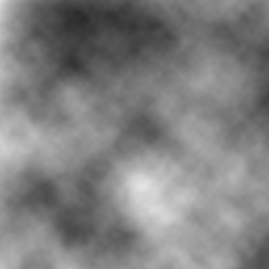
2D Value noise rescaled and added onto itself to create fractal noise

Value noise is a type of noise commonly used as a procedural texture primitive in computer graphics. It is conceptually different from, and often confused with gradient noise, examples of which are Perlin noise and Simplex noise. This method consists of the creation of a lattice of points which are assigned random values. The noise function then returns the interpolated number based on the values of the surrounding lattice points.

For many applications, multiple octaves of this noise can be generated and then summed together, just as can be done with Perlin noise and Simplex noise, in order to create a form of fractal noise.
