= Sausage (disambiguation) =

Sausage is a type of prepared meat.

Sausage may also refer to:

- Sausage (band), a funk metal band fronted by Les Claypool
- Sausage dog, nickname for a Dachshund
- Sausage Software, a now defunct creator of web editing software
- Sausage Galaxy, a former dwarf galaxy that accreted in a violent collision into the Milky Way
- "The Sausages of Babel", a Dutch TV-presenting trio
- The sausage, the name of the device detonated in the Ivy Mike nuclear test
- Sausage (album), a 1992 album by Baboon
