= Frame-IT! =

- The Easy to use HTML generator
- Original author(s): Bruce Hearder
- Developer(s): GME Systems Pty Ltd.
- Initial release: 1996
- Final release: 1.23 / October 10, 1997; 27 years ago
- Operating system: Windows 3.1, Windows 3.11, Windows 95
- Size: 42Kb (16-bit); 34Kb (32-bit)
- Available in: English
- Type: HTML editor
- License: Freeware

Frame-IT! (also known as Frame-it) was an application for developing HTML frames released in 1996 by GME Systems. It featured a user interface in which you could control frame size, the number of frames, frame location, and frame appearance without knowledge of HTML. It allowed completed frames to be copied to clipboard, to be saved, or to be previewed in a browser.

Frame-it was listed in PC/Computing magazine's list of "1,001 Top Free Internet Downloads" for 1997.

Frame-IT! is no longer available at its original website, though it can still be downloaded from mirrors. (Note: Its original site at http://www.iinet.net.au/~bwh/frame-it.html is no longer available.)

== Shareware ==
Although the software originally cost US$15 and came with a 14-day evaluation, by 1999, the software had become freeware. Users were instructed to register using the following code to make full use of the software. (Note: In the Frame-it! documentation for the Windows 95 version, it lists the registering price as 15USD.)

Name : Registered User
Code : 29700

== Releases ==
Frame-It! had the following releases:

- 1.21
- 1.23

== See also ==
- FrameGang
