= Photoshop plugin =

Piece of software that enhance the functionality of Adobe Photoshop

Photoshop plugins (or plug-ins) are add-on programs aimed at providing additional image effects or performing tasks that are impossible or hard to fulfill using Adobe Photoshop alone. Plugins can be opened from within Photoshop and several other image editing programs (compatible with the appropriate Adobe specifications) and act like mini editors that modify the image.

== Plugin types ==
Photoshop-compatible plugins fall into several types, distinguishable in Microsoft Windows (and historically in Mac OS 9 and earlier) by their filename extensions. The most common are filters (.8bf), which apply changes to images. Import or acquisition (.8ba) and export (.8be) plugins acquire or write image data from or to certain devices, while file format (.8bi) plugins open and save less common image formats (not natively supported by Photoshop). Automation (.8li or .8ly) plugins repeat or streamline certain tasks, in the manner of Photoshop actions. (macros). There are several other types of Photoshop plugin.

In modern macOS (from Mac OS X 10.0 Cheetah, onward), all Photoshop plugins are distributed as package folders with an extension of .plugin (or .lrplugin if they are intended for Adobe Lightroom only); the package's Info.plist file includes a CFBundlePackageType code that distinguishes the plugin types, using the same upper-case, four-letter codes originally used in the pre-Mac OS X resource forks; these are generally the same as the Windows extensions but with "M" added to the end (e.g., Windows .8ba = Mac 8BAM).

Below is a complete list of the plugin varieties:

Plugin type	Windows extension	Mac type code
Automation	.8li, .8ly	8LIZ
Color picker	.8bc	8BCM
Export	.8be	8BEM
Extension	.8bx	8BXM
File format	.8bi	8BIF
Filter	.8bf	8BFM
General	.8bp	8BPI
Import	.8ba	8BAM
Parser^{*}	.8by	8BYM
Selection^{*}	.8bs	8BSM

^{*}Only Adobe publishes parser and selection plugins.

=== Host applications ===
Host applications or plugin hosts are graphics applications that are capable of running plugins. Photoshop fully supports all available plugin types; certain Adobe hosts, like Photoshop Elements and Fireworks, support most of them, while Lightroom supports many and also has its own, derived from the Photoshop format.

Many non-Adobe commercial graphics applications also support Photoshop-compatible plugins – Paint Shop Pro, PhotoImpact, and Corel PhotoPaint are some of the better-known ones. There are several dozen more plugin hosts, including lesser-known products like Chasys Draw IES, the free-software image editor GIMP, and viewers like IrfanView. However, the majority of non-Adobe hosts support filter plugins only, and many of them do not even support all available filter plugins. More Microsoft Windows hosts support the plugins, though an increasing number of Mac applications support the Mac Photoshop plugin packages.

Third-party support for plugins was fairly broad and rapid after the release of the Photoshop SDK and API containing the specifications for Photoshop plugins. Non-Adobe implementation contracted and fragmented in 2002, when Adobe restricted access to the SDK and made the developer license more expensive. Developers of other image applications had limited or no access to it any longer, and in many cases either did not support newer plugin features or simply did not implement Photoshop plugin support at all. Plugin developers faced a dilemma: either support the new features that appeared in Photoshop 7 and later versions, like access to layers, but lose compatibility with various other image applications; or use the old SDK version which already included many of the important specifications and make sure their plugins would be supported by all hosts, but at the cost of a smaller feature set.

Around 2005, Adobe changed the policy again, so that developers could make a request for the SDK via a Web-based form, with no fees, and with all requests handled individually. It is unclear what criteria have been applied, though third-party implementation of support for Photoshop plugins has increased again, is more consistent (few old plugins have remained viable from the 2000s, as operating systems and have changed in the interim), and the feature remains popular and in demand by users of graphic-editing software.

Some commercial and free projects have also created their own plugin formats, and the general concept (also common among digital audio workstations) has spread to other visual editing applications, including video compositors, 3D modeling suites, and CAD applications.

== History ==
Year	Event
1991	Adobe introduces filters and support for third-party Photoshop-compatible plugins in Photoshop 2.0. Aldus Corporation releases Aldus Gallery Effects, a set of filters including Emboss, Mosaic, Charcoal, and other effects, which after Aldus and Adobe merged in 1996, become a native part of Photoshop.
1992	Kai Krause releases one of the most renowned plugins of the 1990s -- Kai's Power Tools (a.k.a. KPT). Many artists of the time consider it a must-have plugin set for Photoshop. It features several advanced warp and deformation effects, as well as support for bump maps and 3D graphics formats (in KPT SceneBuilder).
1994	Joe Ternasky releases Filter Factory, a plugin allowing users to create their own filters using an internal programming language resembling C and compile them as separate plugins. It uses programmable formulas to process the red, green and blue channels of each pixel of the image. However, the fact that it requires considerable programming skills is viewed by many as a serious drawback.
1994	Alien Skin Software, founded a year earlier, creates the first drop shadow filter for Photoshop. The same year, they also release the Black Box filter set, later renamed to Eye Candy, which becomes an all-time favorite among Photoshop users.
1994	Auto FX Software is founded. In the subsequent years they release a couple of much-noticed Photoshop plugins and automated effects software products. Photo/Graphic Edges is one of the common image enhancement tools used by graphic artists of the time.
1997	Alex Hunter, inspired by KPT but dissatisfied with the limitations of the Filter Factory, presents FilterMeister -- "a 'bigger and better' Filter Factory". It is said to be much easier to use than Filter Factory, and many of today's free and commercial plugins are made in FilterMeister.
2007	Filter Forge Inc. brings procedural texturing to Photoshop by releasing Filter Forge, a plugin allowing users to build custom filters without any programming. In Filter Forge, filters are assembled in a visual node-based environment.
2008	YouSendIt Inc. enables delivering files across different users/computers from within Photoshop.
2008	Adobe introduces their first Flash extension panel SDK for better integration of plugins with the UI. Anastasiy Safari builds MagicPicker, the first and well noticed color picking extension suite for tablets based on it.

Plugins distributed under various licensing models, including "try before buy" commercial software, shareware, limited freemium versions, and "free for personal use" freeware.

== See also ==
- Adobe Photoshop
- Plugin
- Nik Collection
