= Sausage Software =

Now defunct creator of web editing software

- Type: Proprietary limited company
- Industry: Web publishing
- Genre: Web development
- Founded: Melbourne, Australia (1995)
- Founder: Steve Outtrim
- Fate: Merged into SMS Management & Technology in 2000
- Headquarters: Melbourne, Australia
- Key people: Kevin Pownall (Chief Operating Officer) Jim Paulyshyn (Marketing Director); Steve Meltzer (Marketing Director); Adrian Vanzyl (Director of software development) Marty Hill (Senior Systems Engineer)
- Products: HotDog Web Editor

Sausage Software was an Australian software company, founded by entrepreneur Steve Outtrim, which produced one of the world's most successful web editors: the HotDog web authoring tool. The product and company name have since been purchased by an Australian consulting firm, SMS Management & Technology.

HotDog and the company became the 'dotcom darling' of the Australian media receiving a large amount of media exposure due to the young age of the company's founder and staff featuring pinball machines and a pool table in the company's reception area.

Sausage Software also invested in various other pioneering software strategies and products:

- A range of small independent software products called "snaglets"
- A unique freeware texture generator called Reptile
- An early micro-payment system called the eVend Cashlet
- A Java Electronic Commerce Server (JECS), a generalised middleware layer serving Java Applets with database data on request via an XML-like request/response protocol.

Their website was one of the most popular at the time, receiving 250,000 hits per day in 1996.

== Products ==
Software

- Boomer
- HotDog
- Reptile
- SiteFx
- Business in a Box

Snaglets

- Bandwidth Buster
- Bookworm
- Broadway
- Clikette
- CrossEye
- Dummy
- Egor the Animator
- Fash
- FrameGang
- Gatling
- ImageWiz
- Jackhammer
- Lockout
- Mousetrap
- Swami

Other

- Weenies
