= Image analogy =

An image analogy is a method of creating an image filter automatically from training data. In an image analogy process, the transformation between two images A and A' is "learned". Later, given a different image B, its "analogy" image B' can be generated based on the learned transformation.

The image analogy method has been used to simulate many types of image filters:

- Toy filters, such as blurring or "embossing";
- Texture synthesis from an example texture;
- Super-resolution, inferring a high-resolution image from a low-resolution source;
- Texture transfer, in which images are "texturized" with some arbitrary source texture;
- Artistic filters, in which various drawing and painting styles, including oil, pastel, and pen-and-ink rendering, are synthesized based on scanned real-world examples;
- Texture-by-numbers, in which realistic scenes, composed of a variety of textures, are created using a simple "painting" interface;
- Image colorization, where color is automatically added to grayscale images.
