= TexRD =

Specialized graphics software

TexRD is specialized graphics software, designed to simulate reaction–diffusion processes and to produce animated random textures through the underlying mathematical models.

== Principles ==
Complex chemical reactions between several fluids are simulated by computer and produce various patterns through a self-organization process. Similar morphogenesis phenomena (spontaneous build-up of shapes) are observed in the real life and can account -at least on a qualitative point of view-for the patterns observed on animal skins such as tigers or zebra, tropical fishes, sea shells, minerals such as agate... The software always creates seamless textures. Beyond the classical and well studied reaction–diffusion models such as the Brusselator, the software also contains new reaction–diffusion equations invented by the author, who worked 4 years as a researcher in this field.

== Applications ==
TexRD was designed at first for graphic designers and cyber artists. Seen also as mathematical game, it allows science lovers to create new and original textures because the number of parameter combinations is nearly infinite. The interest of playing with a texture generator (discovering new patterns) also comes from the fact that many reaction–diffusion patterns cannot be predicted by the theory - except for the simplest models. They require multiple trials associating chance, observations and attempts to find the rules governing the effects of the various parameters. Such textures produced from computer simulations can be used to create abstract images for postal cards, front pages, bindings, paper bookmarks, wallpapers, as well as new ideas for decoration patterns. Computer graphics experts also use the textures to cover virtual objects and make them look more realistic (see ray tracing software such as POV-Ray and the example below).

Using reactiondiffusion textures produced with TexRD to cover virtual objects (an example provided with installation files). This simple scene was rendered by POV-Ray software.

== History ==
Luc Decker created the first version of TexRD in October 2002, following some ideas initially developed during his PhD entitled "Random structure models based on Reaction–Diffusion" (1999, "Ecole des Mines de Paris", France). The current version of the software (0.4 beta) was released in July 2003.

== Operating systems ==
English and French versions are available for Windows (all versions). Wine emulator allows Linux users to run the software without known problem.

== Licence ==
TexRD is free for non-commercial use.
