= Clone tool =

Tool used in image manipulation programs

The clone tool, as it is known in Adobe Photoshop, Inkscape, GIMP, and Corel PhotoPaint, is used in digital image editing to replace information for one part of a picture with information from another part. In other image editing software, its equivalent is sometimes called a rubber stamp tool or a clone brush.

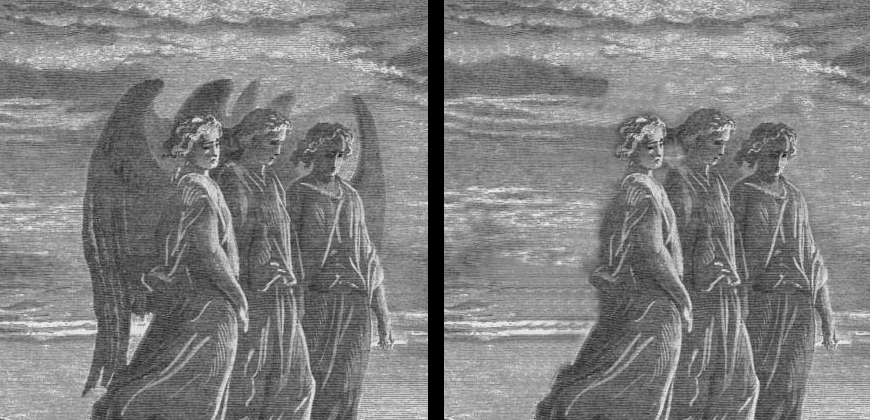
Demonstration of the clone tool to alter an image

== Applications ==
The clone tool can remove objects by copying a nearby background. The user selects a matching location as the source, then paints over the element to be hidden.

A typical use for the tool is in object removal – more colloquially, "airbrushing" or "photoshopping" out an unwanted part of the image.

If a part of an image is removed simply by cutting it out, then a hole is left in the background. The Clone tool can fill in this hole convincingly with a copy of the existing background from elsewhere in the image.

A common use for this tool is to retouch skin, particularly in portraits, to remove blemishes and make skin tones more even. Cloning can also be used to remove other unwanted elements, such as telephone wires, an unwanted bird in the sky, and the like.

A more automated method of object removal uses texture synthesis to fill in gaps. Of these, patch-based texture synthesis or "image quilting" is essentially an automated application of the clone tool, choosing the optimal source area so as to patch over with a minimal seam.

In some cases, the undesired object is mixed with the remainder of the image, and a simple circular brush, even with feathering, would not work. For these cases, some programs allow an object to be selected by color/outline so other areas are not affected. Other programs allow edge/color sensitive brushes to deal with such objects.

== Healing tool ==
A similar tool is the healing tool, which occurs in variants such as the healing brush or spot healing tool. These incorporate the existing texture, rather than painting it over.

== See also ==
- Inpainting
- Seam carving
