= List of games using procedural generation =

Procedural generation is a common technique in computer programming to automate the creation of certain data according to guidelines set by the programmer. Many games generate aspects of the environment or non-player characters procedurally during the development process in order to save time on asset creation. For example, SpeedTree is a middleware package that procedurally generates trees which can be used to quickly populate a forest. Whereas most games use this technique to create a static environment for the final product, some employ procedural generation as a game mechanic, such as to create new environments for the player to explore. The levels in Spelunky are procedurally generated by rearranging premade tiles of geometry into a level with an entrance, exit, a solvable path between the two, and obstacles to that path. Other games procedurally generate other aspects of gameplay, such as the weapons in Borderlands which have randomized stats and configurations.

This is a list of video games that use procedural generation as a core aspect of gameplay. Games that use procedural generation solely during development as part of asset creation are not included.

== List ==
=== Roguelike games ===
Games in the roguelike genre all have at least procedurally generated levels.

=== Other ===
Title	Year	Developer(s)	Procedural content
.kkrieger	2004	Farbrausch	Most of the meshes and textures are procedurally generated, and the music is procedurally generated during runtime.
7 Days to Die	2013	The Fun Pimps	Maps (Worlds) can be generated, either randomly, using a seed, or via third party tools. The distribution of POIs and loot is also generative.
Anarchy Online	2001	Funcom	Mission rewards, loot, dungeon layout, and location on the world map can be generated based on selections made at mission terminals.
Astroneer	2019	System Era Softworks	Procedural planet terrain.
Banished	2014	Shining Rock Software	Terrain map.
Borderlands series	2009–2019	Gearbox Software, 2K Australia	Weapons.
Civilization series	1991–2025	MicroProse, Activision, Firaxis Games	Customizable world map.
Core Keeper	2022	Pugstorm	Explorable underground world
Crypt of the NecroDancer	2015	Brace Yourself Games	2D grid-based top-down dungeons with halls and rooms with randomly placed enemies and items.
Cubic Odyssey	2025	Atypical Games	Voxel-based 3D planets, star systems.
Deep Rock Galactic	2018	Ghost Ship Games	Cave systems separated into rooms and tunnels by walls of dirt.
Descenders	2018	RageSquid	3D downhill courses on relatively dirt trails.
Don't Starve	2013	Klei Entertainment	Flat 2D world. Later expanded with cavern systems and oceans.
Dwarf Fortress	2006	Tarn Adams	Almost entirety of game content based in a layered 3D world with elements like its history, creatures and narrative, religion, etc.
Elite	1984	David Braben, Ian Bell	Eight 3D wireframe galaxies consisting of 256 procedurally generated star systems each
Enter the Gungeon	2016	Dodge Roll	2D flat dungeon levels made of room "chunks".
Factorio	2016	Wube Software	2D terrain map generation.
Fuel	2009	Asobo Studio	3D terrain, uses a fixed map seed.
Islanders	2019	Grizzly Games	3D terrain generation of islands.
Left 4 Dead 2	2009	Valve	Gameplay changes to match player's performance, such as enemies, paths, or weather.
Minecraft	2011	Mojang Studios	Voxel-based 3D world. Effectively infinite.
Minecraft Dungeons	2020	Mojang Studios	Randomly-generated 3D dungeons filled with monsters, traps and puzzles, and treasures.
Mini Metro	2015	Dinosaur Polo Club	Abstract 2D levels and audio system.
No Man's Sky	2016	Hello Games	3D galaxies with planets and their flora and fauna.
Pixel Piracy	2015	Quadro Delta	2D world, including islands, towns and shops, as well as ship's crew.
RimWorld	2013 (EA)	Ludeon Studios	Customization 3D spherical world map and flat 2D gameplay map, as well as many elements, notably narrative and events.
Rogue Legacy	2011	Cellar Door Games	Side-scrolling castle, made up of interconnected rooms.
The Sentinel	1986	Firebird	3D terrain generation for all 10,000 levels.
Sir, You Are Being Hunted	2014	Big Robot	An open world island landscape.
Spelunky	2008	Mossmouth	Side-scrolling underground rectangular levels made up of tiles.
Spore	2008	Maxis	3D creatures, tribes, civilizations, planets and terrain, spaceships and galaxies, music, award-winning animation system.
Starbound	2016	Chucklefish	2D side-scrolling planets and content on them, such as dungeons and bosses.
Stardew Valley	2016	ConcernedApe	Cave areas of increasing difficulty and loot.
Starfield	2023	Bethesda Softworks	3D planet terrain and structures, with the exception of hand-crafted cities; events.
Super Meat Boy Forever	2020	Team Meat	2D levels made of procedurally connected level parts.
Terraria	2011	Re-Logic	Side-scrolling rectangular 2D world.
The Binding of Isaac	2011	Edmund McMillen	Bird eye view 2D levels made up of interconnected rectangular rooms with random monsters and loot.
Valheim	2021	Irongate Studios	A procedurally-generated circular map of an archipelago of islands in an ocean; with the player starting the game in the center.
Vintage Story	2016	Anego Studios	A procedurally-generated voxel-based open world of up to 64 million square kilometres with an emphasis on realism. A 2023 update includes "upgraded world generation with various new land forms, a geologic activity system, and large scale mountain regions"
World of Warcraft: Shadowlands	2020	Blizzard Entertainment	Torghast, a dungeon with procedurally-generated enemy spawns.
Microsoft Minesweeper	1990	Microsoft	Rectangular grid of hidden mines.
