= Feathering =

Technique used in computer graphics to blur edges

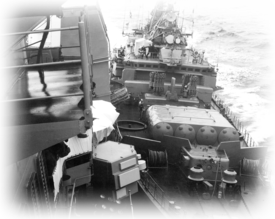
An example of a photograph with feathered edges

Feathering is a technique used in computer graphics software to smooth or blur the edges of a feature. The term is inherited from a technique of fine retouching using feathers.

== Paintbrush feathering ==
Feathering is most commonly used on a paintbrush tool in computer graphics software. This form of feathering makes the painted area appear smooth. It may give the effect of an airbrush or spraypaint. Color is concentrated at the center of the brush area, and it blends out toward the edges.

== Selection feathering ==
Feathering is not only used on paintbrushes in computer graphics software. Feathering may also blend the edges of a selected feature into the background of the image. When composing an image from pieces of other images, feathering helps make added features look "in place" with the background image. For instance, if someone wanted to add a leaf to a photograph of grass using computer graphics software, they might use feathering on the leaf to make it blend in with the grassy background.

== Clone tool feathering ==
The "Clone" tool is very important in photograph manipulation on computer graphics software. The clone tool is used to actively copy and offset pixels from one area of an image to another while the artist moves the clone tool around the area to be copied. A good example is the use of the clone tool to cover a skin blemish by copying skin from one area of an image and placing it over the blemish. A crucial aspect of making a clone tool blend well in an image is to use feathering on the clone tool. This makes the pixels being copied have more effect on the area they are copied to closer to where the artist is dragging their mouse or stylus, and makes the pixels have less effect the further they are from the clone tool (and where the artist is using it). Thus, with the skin example, skin pixels copied directly over the blemish will have a strong effect on the blemish and hide it, but skin pixels copied to the area around the blemish will be less effective, and will keep the natural look of the skin (wrinkles etc.) intact as much as possible.

== See also ==
- Metering mode
- Vignetting
- Aliasing
