= Ken Perlin =

American computer scientist

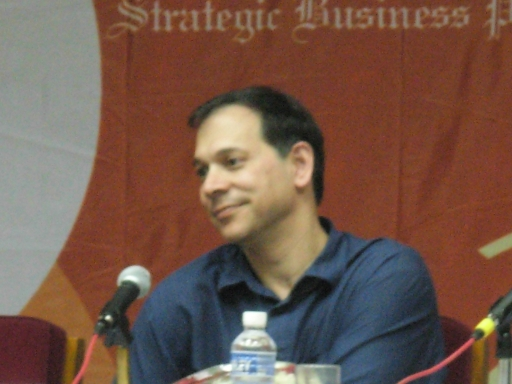
- Ken Perlin in 2007
- Education: Harvard University; New York University
- Scientific career
- Thesis: Synthesizing Realistic Textures by the Composition of Perceptually Motivated Functions (1986)
- Doctoral advisor: David G. Lowe
- Website: cs.nyu.edu/~perlin/

Kenneth H. Perlin is a professor in the Department of Computer Science at New York University, founding director of the Media Research Lab at NYU, director of the Future Reality Lab at NYU, and the director of the Games for Learning Institute.

He holds a B.A. degree in theoretical mathematics from Harvard University (1979), a M.S. degree in computer science from the Courant Institute of Mathematical Sciences, New York University (1984), and a Ph.D. degree in computer science from the same institution (1986). His research interests include graphics, animation, multimedia, and science education. He developed or was involved with the development of techniques such as Perlin noise, real-time interactive character animation, and computer-user interfaces. He is best known for the development of Perlin noise and simplex noise, both of which are algorithms for generating realistic-looking gradient noise.

He is a collaborator of the World Building Institute.

== Awards ==
In 1996, Perlin received an Academy Award for Technical Achievement from the Academy of Motion Picture Arts and Sciences, for the development of Perlin noise. He had introduced this technique with the goal to produce natural-appearing textures on computer-generated surfaces for motion picture visual effects, while working on the Walt Disney Productions' 1982 feature film Tron for which he had developed a large part of the software.

== See also ==
- Perlin noise
- Quikwriting
- Simplex noise
