= Metering mode =

Way in which a camera determines exposure

In photography, the metering mode refers to the way in which a camera determines exposure. Cameras generally allow the user to select between spot, center-weighted average, or multi-zone metering modes. The different metering modes allow the user to select the most appropriate one for use in a variety of lighting conditions. In complex light situations professional photographers tend to switch to manual mode, rather than depending on a setting determined by the camera.

== Examples of metering modes ==
Digital metering feedback

Analog metering feedback (light meter)

=== Spot metering ===
With spot metering, the camera will measure only a very small area of the scene (1–5% of the viewfinder area). By default this is the centre of the scene. The user can select a different off-centre spot or recompose by moving the camera after metering. Certain models support a mode which allows averaging of multiple spot meter readings, and some support metering of highlight and shadow areas.

Spot metering is not influenced by other areas in the frame. It is commonly used to shoot very high contrast scenes. For example, in a backlit situation a rising sun may be behind a person whose face will be much darker than the bright halo around the body and hairline. Spot metering allows the camera to measure the light reflected from the person's face and expose properly for that, instead of adjusting exposure for the much brighter light around the hairline. With the face properly exposed, the area around the back and hairline will become over-exposed. In many cases spot metering will over or underexpose a portion of the scene, so that the point of interest will be correctly exposed.

Another example of the use of spot metering is photographing the moon. Other metering methods will increase overall exposure in an attempt to lighten the dark sky area, resulting in overexposure of the moon. Spot metering gives correct exposure of the moon and underexposes the rest of the scene which was dark already, so the low exposure is not noticeable. Spot metering may also be used for theatre photography, where brightly lit actors appear in a darkened auditorium. Spot metering is a method upon which the Zone System depends.

=== Center-weighted average metering ===
In this system, the meter concentrates on the central 60–80% of the scene. The balance is then "feathered" out towards the edges. This mode of exposure is less influenced by peripheral areas of the scene and is therefore well suited for photographs with subjects or objects of interest in the central part of the image. Some cameras allow the user to adjust the weight/balance of the central portion to the peripheral one. If the camera allows a user to move the focus point off the image center, metering will occur around the new focus location. Although promoted as a feature, center-weighted metering was originally a consequence of the meter reading from the focusing screen of SLR cameras. Light scatter from the focusing screen and proximity of the meter cell caused less sensitivity at the edges.

=== Average metering ===
In this metering mode, the camera uses light information from the entire scene and creates an average for the final exposure setting, giving no weighting to any particular portion of the metered area. In some situations, such as a snowy landscape, this mode will result in underexposure by 2 f-stops or more, because the metering system attempts to darken an excessively bright scene.

=== Partial (selective) metering ===
This mode meters a larger area than spot metering (around 10–15% of the entire frame), and is generally used when very bright or very dark areas on the edges of the frame would otherwise unduly influence the metering. As in spot metering, some cameras can use variable points for readings or use a fixed point in the centre of the viewfinder.

=== Multi-zone metering ===
Honeycomb Metering on a Dynax 5D. The AF point was set to the eye of the toy; the camera has been able to produce a good exposure, by not being fooled by the strong back lighting of the out of focus areas.

This mode is also called matrix, evaluative, honeycomb, segment metering, or esp (electro selective pattern) metering on some cameras. This metering mode was first introduced by the Nikon FA and was termed Automatic Multi-Pattern metering. The FA, released in September 1983, divided the frame into five segments; Nikon had developed the system by comparing the readings of an experimental 24-segment sensor with frames judged to be optimally exposed, selected from thousands of rolls of film. On a number of cameras this is the default or standard setting. The camera measures the light intensity in several points in the scene and then combines the results to find the setting for the best exposure. The method of calculation can be different from camera to camera. The actual number of zones used varies widely, from several to over a thousand. The design concept behind multi-zone is to reduce the need to use exposure compensation.

Many manufacturers keep their exact calculation methods confidential as proprietary information. A number of factors are taken into consideration, including: autofocus point, distance to subject, areas in or out of focus, colours/hues of the scene, and backlighting. Multi-zone tends to bias its exposure towards the autofocus point, thus ensuring that the point of interest has been exposed properly. A database of thousands of exposures may be pre-stored in the camera, and the processor can use that information to determine what is being photographed.

Some cameras allow the option of locking exposure when autofocus is achieved. In other cameras the AF point is not used for exposure calculation, and in such cases it is common for metering to default to a central point in the viewfinder, using a pattern based on that area. There is considerable variation among different manufacturers how multi-zone metering is implemented–even in the model range of the same brand–and how much priority is given to the AF point itself. Some "Scene" modes, such as sunset, sports and night exposures also often affect the calculations of this metering pattern.

=== Highlight-weighted metering ===
In this mode, introduced by Nikon with the D810 in 2014, clipping is reduced by using a high resolution metering sensor and analyzing each area for washed-out ("blown") highlights or underexposed shadows. Although there are some similarities with multi-zone, matrix, or evaluative metering, this mode uses a high-resolution sensor for detailed detection and gives more weight to reduce clipping.

== See also ==
- Feathering
- Vignetting
