= Quikwriting =

Quikwriting is a continuous stylus-based text entry system which is an alternative to Graffiti. It was developed by Ken Perlin at the NYU Media Research Lab and presented at the ACM UIST '98 conference.

Perlin described the technique as quicker than Graffiti however the learning curve was steeper with at most people taking an hour to become moderately effective.

The technique works by keeping the stylus continuously on the screen. A method of using the system involves thinking of screen in terms of a flower with eight petals and a stamen. Eight characters or punctuation are allocated to each petal and the stylus is moved from petal to petal via the stamen or directly to form words. Eventually a user learns the shape for particular words and the process becomes quicker.

Quikwriting was reported by the Economist to have gain a small following on Palm PDAs and that by 2005 Microsoft had licensed the Quikwriting and were using it as part of the XNav project.
