= Wavelet noise =

Type of noise in computer graphics

Wavelet noise is an alternative to Perlin noise which reduces the problems of aliasing and detail loss that are encountered when Perlin noise is summed into a fractal.

== Algorithm detail ==
The basic algorithm for 2-dimensional wavelet noise is as follows:

- Create an image, $R$, filled with uniform white noise.
- Downsample $R$ to half-size to create $R^\downarrow$, then upsample it back up to full size to create $R^{\downarrow\uparrow}$.
- Subtract $R^{\downarrow\uparrow}$ from $R$ to create the end result, $N$.

This results in an image that contains all the information that cannot be represented at half-scale. From here, $N$ can be used similarly to Perlin noise to create fractal patterns.
