= Steve Outtrim =

New Zealand businessman

- Born: 1973 (age 52–53)
- Education: Victoria University of Wellington
- Occupations: Entrepreneur former CEO of Sausage Software
- Years active: 1995–present
- Known for: Pioneer / entrepreneur of Sausage software
- Website: www.linkedin.com/in/steveouttrim

Steve Outtrim (born 1973) is a technology entrepreneur from New Zealand. He is best known for his success in the early "dot com years" of the Internet, as the creator of Sausage Software and its flagship product, the HotDog Web Editor. He has also founded software company Urbanise and domestic energy conservation company ekoLiving, and is the former owner of nutraceutical company Aussie Bodies. He is the editor and main writer of Burners.me, a website that discusses Burning Man culture.

== Early life and education ==
Outtrim was born in Wellington, New Zealand in 1973 and graduated from Wellington College (New Zealand) high school in 1989. By 1992 he had completed a Bachelor of Commerce and Administration (BCA), from Victoria University of Wellington

== First business ==
Outtrim founded Sausage Software in 1995. At that stage of the Internet's development, graphics had only just come to the World Wide Web, with Marc Andreessen's breakthrough NCSA Mosaic, which later became Netscape. There were very few pages with images, and not much search capability. Yahoo was just a list of interesting content, before it was a search engine.

Outtrim wanted to make a Web page and put up a picture of himself and information about the music he liked. He tried using HoTMetaL and Web Edit but was frustrated when both programs crashed with the blue screen of death. He decided he could do a better job himself. He built HotDog, an HTML Authoring tool using Visual Basic. It could write Web pages like a word processor, with a WYSIWYG interface, an auto-save feature and other features designed to make it easy to manage sites with many pages. Steve incorporated easy to use, context sensitive help which the competing programs lacked.

He created his own superdistribution system using cryptography and the Windows Registry. This enabled the business model of Sausage Software, which was to give away something of value for free, but time limit its use to 30 days. This "Free/Pro" distribution model was known as Shareware, and was employed by many small software vendors on the Internet and Bulletin Board Systems (BBS). However very few of them used sophisticated techniques to enforce the 30-day time limit, or electronic direct marketing to convert users from the free version to the paid version.

Sausage Software grew rapidly despite competition from major software houses such as Microsoft, Adobe Systems, Symantec and IBM. In 1997 Wired magazine rated HotDog the No. 3 most popular program on the Internet, after Netscape (browser) and Eudora (mail client).

== Dot-com career ==
Outtrim was one of the first people to create a successful global e-commerce business on the Internet. Sausage.com was a fully automated business, open 24/7 in every country in the world and with no staff or inventory required to make a sale. Steve employed software developers and customer support staff, who used the internet to rapidly incorporate user suggestions into the product and release them back to the user community. Within a month of launch he had customers in more than 200 different countries. The customers would get the program for free, use it for 30 days, then if they wanted to keep using it, provide their credit card details to a secure web server, and receive an email with a 16-digit licensing code. This code was locked to the user name and email address using a cryptographic hash, to discourage piracy.

Outtrim took Sausage Software public on the Australian Stock Exchange in October 1996. This made him the youngest CEO of a public company in Australia. In 2000 he left the company when it merged with SMS Management and Technology, an IT consulting firm. He reportedly made A$51 million from the company after selling off large parts of his share before the dot com crash. Outtrim was an early promoter of Java technology from Sun Microsystems, creating the first Java applets to be sold over the Internet and the first Java micropayments system.

== Current activities ==
Outtrim left Sausage Software in an executive role in 1999 and departed from the board of directors in 2000.

Since then he has been involved in a number of start-up companies, most notably as:

- Former owner of Aussie Bodies, which was acquired by Healtheries in 2004.
- Founder of software company Majitek, which closed a Series B investment with Cisco Systems in February 2009 and opened an office in Dubai.
- Founder and owner of ekoLiving which specialises in domestic energy conservation using software, hardware, and networks.
- He created an "energy group" (named eKoSchool) at his former school, Wellington College. The aim of this group is to find ways of reducing energy usage.

In 2014, Majitek changed its name to Urbanise.com and listed on the Australian Stock Exchange (ASX code: UBN). Its technology is being used in the world's 4 tallest buildings. Outtrim stepped down from the Board before the IPO.

In 2017, Steve Outtrim founded zMint to help companies get on the blockchain.
