= Bitmap textures =

Bitmap textures are digital images that represent surfaces, materials, patterns, or pictures. They are commonly used to give texture to models, renders, or environments in animation or video games. These textures are created by artists or designers using bitmap editor software such as Adobe Photoshop or GIMP, or simply by scanning an image and, if necessary, retouching it on a personal computer.

Bitmap images are typically made up of pixels, and each individual pixel represents a single point of color. By adjusting their size, frequency and color, graphic designers can create the illusion of depth and texture.

Bitmap textures can be built as an image larger than the final destination, so as to fill the complete area without repeating the image, avoiding visible seams. Bitmap textures can also be created to be used as repetitive patterns to fill an infinite area.

When designed for print, textures are generally high-resolution in order to achieve good results in the final print. If the texture is meant to be used in multimedia, 3D animation or web design, they are created in a maximum resolution equal to that of the final display.

Vector graphics are an alternative to bitmap images and are made of geometric shapes, lines and curves which rely on mathematical formulas to maintain their shape.

== See also ==
- Procedural textures
