= List of 3D graphics libraries =

3D graphics have become so popular, particularly in video games, that specialized APIs (application programming interfaces) have been created to ease the processes in all stages of computer graphics generation. These APIs have also proved vital to computer graphics hardware manufacturers, as they provide a way for programmers to access the hardware in an abstract way, while still taking advantage of the special hardware of any specific graphics card.

The first 3D graphics framework was probably Core, published by the ACM in 1977.

== Low-level 3D API ==
These APIs for 3D computer graphics are particularly popular:

- ANGLE, web browsers graphics engine, a cross-platform translator of OpenGL ES calls to DirectX, OpenGL, or Vulkan API calls.
- Direct3D (a subset of DirectX)
- Mesa
- Metal developed by Apple.
- OpenGL and the OpenGL Shading Language
- OpenGL ES 3D API for embedded devices.
- OptiX developed by NVIDIA.
- Vulkan developed by Khronos Group

== Web-based API ==
- WebGL is a JavaScript interface for OpenGL ES API, promoted by Khronos.
- WebGPU is a newer and more efficient API for JavaScript, Rust, C++ and C. It is not yet fully supported by all browsers (see Implementation Status).

== High-level 3D API ==
There are also higher-level 3D scene-graph APIs which provide additional functionality on top of the lower-level rendering API. Such libraries under active development include:

- Ab4d.SharpEngine
- ArkGraphics 3D
- BGFX
- ClanLib
- HOOPS 3D Graphics System
- Horde3D
- Java FX
- JMonkey Engine
- JT Open from Siemens Digital Industries Software
- LibGDX
- magnum
- OGRE
- OpenGL Performer
- RAMSES
- Panda3D
- UNIGINE
- VTK
- WPF 3D (part of Windows Presentation Foundation)

=== JavaScript-based engines ===
There is more interest in web browser based high-level API for 3D graphics engines. Some are:

- A-Frame
- Babylon.js
- Three.js
- Verge3D

== See also ==
- Graphics library
- Game engine
- 3D computer graphics software
