= TriOviz for Games =

- Developers: Darkworks, TriOviz
- Written in: C++, HLSL, GLSL, Cg
- Operating system: Cross-platform
- Available in: English
- Type: Game middleware
- License: Proprietary
- Website: www.trioviz-for-games.com

TriOviz for Games Technology is a software development kit that works with Sony PlayStation 3, Microsoft Xbox 360, and PC.

TriOviz for Games Technology allows a video game to display on a 3D TV (via HDMI 1.3 or HDMI 1.4 connection) as well as on a traditional 2D HDTV set (LCD and plasma) with the TriOviz Inficolor 3D technology. It uses glasses with complex color filters and dedicated image processing that allow natural color perception with a pleasant 3D experience. When observed without glasses, some slight doubling can be noticed in the background of the action which allows the film or game to be watched in 2D without the glasses. This is not possible with traditional brute force anaglyphic systems.

TriOviz for Games Technology was showcased in June 2010 at Electronic Entertainment Expo 2010 by Mark Rein (vice president of Epic Games) as a 3D tech demo running on an Xbox 360 with Gears of War 2. In October 2010, this technology was integrated in Unreal Engine 3, the computer game engine developed by Epic Games, allowing numerous past and upcoming games developed on Xbox 360 and PS3 to be updated with 3D.

TriOviz for Games Technology is used by video games like Batman Arkham Asylum: Game of the Year Edition (March 2010), "Enslaved: Odyssey to the West + DLC Pigsy's Perfect 10" (Nov. 2010), "Thor: God of Thunder" (May 2011), "Green Lantern: Rise of the Manhunters" (June 2011), "Captain America: Super Soldier" (July 2011), "Gears of War 3" (September 2011), "Batman: Arkham City" (October 2011), "Assassin's Creed: Revelations" (November 2011), "Assassin's Creed III" (October 2012).
