= RenderMan =

The name RenderMan has been used to refer to various technologies and projects related to work initially done by Pixar Animation Studios:

- RenderMan Interface Specification (RISpec), an open API (technical specification) developed by Pixar for a standard communications protocol (or interface) between 3D computer graphics programs and rendering programs to describe three-dimensional scenes and turn them into digital photorealistic images
  - RenderMan Shading Language, a component of the RISpec used to define shaders
- Pixar RenderMan, a RISpec-compliant rendering software system developed by Pixar based on their own interface specification
- RenderMan, commonly used to refer to other renderers compliant with the RISpec
