= RenderDoc =

Open source frame debugger

- Developer: Baldur Karlsson
- Release: 2014-02-25
- Stable release: 1.40 / September 5, 2025; 11 months ago
- Operating system: Android, Google Stadia, Linux, Nintendo Switch, Microsoft Windows
- Platform: Cross-platform
- License: MIT License
- Website: renderdoc.org
- Repository: Renderdoc on Github

RenderDoc is a free and open source frame debugger that can be used to analyze single frames generated by other software programs such as games. It can provide in-depth analysis of single frames from any application that uses Vulkan, D3D11, OpenGL & OpenGL ES, or D3D12. RenderDoc also allows the user to manipulate a captured frame to inspect different things such as pipeline stage, commands, texture maps, models, assets, and more. Furthermore, it is able to capture assets outside the view of the game's camera and supports analyzing frame rendering costs on the graphics processing unit.

Optimizing GPU programs is about finding bottlenecks. RenderDoc provides information of the calls on the GPU, the number of invocation of each shader, and the number of primitives and fragments generated.

Baldur Karlsson started RenderDoc development as a spare-time project out of need for a reliable debugger and was then expanded to support more platforms. In 2014 Crytek announced the source code for RenderDoc is released for free. At GDC 2018, AMD announced that Radeon GPU Profiler would include support for RenderDoc. RenderDoc also integrates with well known game engines such as Unity and Unreal Engine. Oculus maintains its own fork of RenderDoc.
