= LunarG =

American software company

- Industry: Software industry, computer graphics
- Founded: 2009; 17 years ago
- Headquarters: Colorado, United States
- Website: lunarg.com

LunarG is an American software company specializing in device driver development for video cards.

== History ==
In 2001, Jens Owen cofounded Tungsten Graphics, a software company working on video card drivers, which among other things, developed the Gallium3D framework for graphics drivers. The company was acquired by VMware in 2008; a year later, Jens Owen along with Alan Ward founded LunarG to continue this work.

In November 2015, LunarG announced that the company is splitting into two groups. The desktop group, funded by Valve, will continue as LunarG. The mobile group will move to Google, presumably to work on Vulkan support on Android. This split follows Google's announcement from August 2015 that Vulkan would be supported by the Android platform.

== Projects ==
LunarG is developing tools and infrastructure for the Vulkan graphics API, designed to be the successor for OpenGL, with sponsorship from Valve. This includes an open source SDK for Vulkan, released together with the finalised Vulkan 1.0 specification. This SDK includes tools for developing Vulkan applications on Windows and Linux, including the official Khronos driver loader, validation layers, debugging and tracing tools. During the development of the Vulkan standard, LunarG independently developed a Vulkan-compatible runtime and driver for Intel HD Graphics chips, although the official driver is developed by Intel.

Since 2014, LunarG is working with Valve to improve the graphics driver stack on Linux, in particular, Mesa and the driver for Intel HD Graphics. As a showcase, they also developed a separate unofficial driver for HD Graphics called the "ILO", based on Gallium3D.
