= Raspberry Pi 4 =

4th generation of the mainline series of Raspberry Pi single-board computer

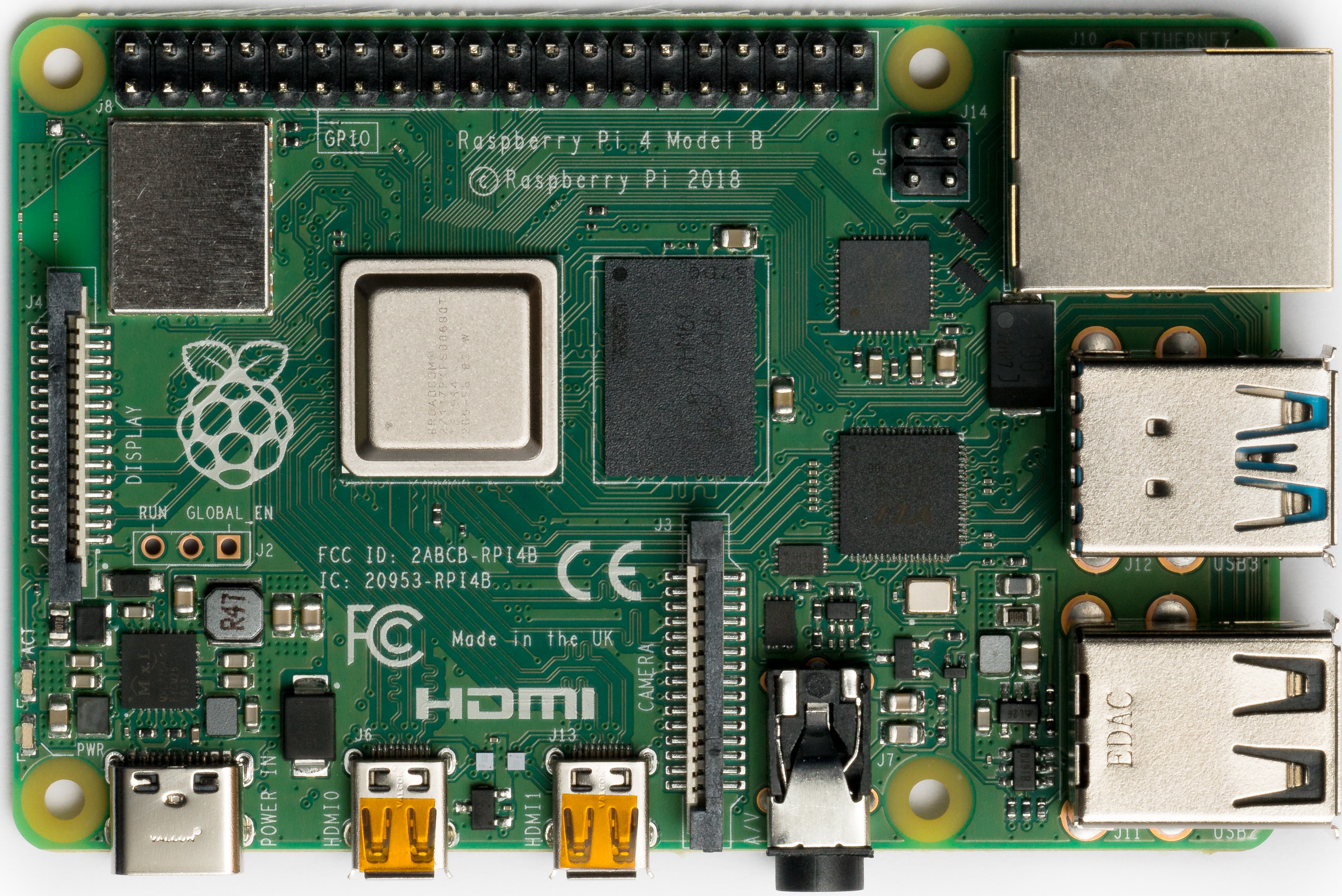
- Also known as: Pi 4, RPi4
- Developer: Raspberry Pi Holdings
- Type: Single-board computer
- Released: 24 June 2019; 7 years ago
- Lifespan: Will remain in production until January 2034
- Introductory price: $35 (1 GB) $45 (2 GB) $83.75 (3 GB) $55 (4 GB) $75 (8 GB)
- Operating system: Raspberry Pi OS (default)
- System on a chip: Broadcom BCM2711
- CPU: Quad-core ARM Cortex-A72 @ 1.5 or 1.8 GHz
- Memory: 1, 2, 3, 4 or 8 GB (LPDDR4)
- Removable storage: MicroSD, USB
- Display: Up to 4k@60fps via [micro-HDMI]
- Graphics: VideoCore VI @ 500 MHz
- Power: 5V @ 3A via USB-C or PoE (with additional HAT)
- Predecessor: Raspberry Pi 3B+
- Successor: Raspberry Pi 5

The Raspberry Pi 4 is the fourth generation of the Raspberry Pi flagship series of single-board computers. Developed by Raspberry Pi Holdings and released on 24 June 2019, it introduced significant upgrades over its predecessor. At its core, the Pi 4 features a Broadcom BCM2711 system on a chip (SoC), which has a quad-core 64-bit ARM Cortex-A72 CPU and a VideoCore VI GPU, offering a boost in processing and graphics performance.

Among other notable hardware improvements are the addition of two USB 3.0 ports, the inclusion of true gigabit Ethernet, and support for dual displays at 4K resolution through two micro-HDMI ports. Furthermore, RAM options go beyond the 1 GB standard of previous models, adding 2, 4, and 8 GB variants. While the base model with 1 GB of RAM maintained the $35 price point that had become a hallmark of the Raspberry Pi series, the higher RAM variants exceeded this price due to increased production costs.

On 28 September 2023, the Raspberry Pi 5 was announced, succeeding the Raspberry Pi 4.

== Features ==
=== CPU ===
The Raspberry Pi 4 features a Broadcom BCM2711 SoC, which is a significant upgrade over previous models. It retains the quad-core design of the BCM2837 used in the Raspberry Pi 3 series but uses more powerful ARM Cortex-A72 CPU cores based on the ARMv8 64-bit architecture, running at either 1.5 or 1.8 GHz depending on the chip revision. Early models used the B0 stepping (an earlier chip version), while later revisions adopted the C0 stepping in mid-2021, which offers improved thermal performance and the higher clock speed. The BCM2711 is about 50% faster than the BCM2837 used in the Raspberry Pi 3 Model B+. The processor includes 32 KB of L1 cache, 48 KB of L1 instruction cache per core, and a shared 1 MB L2 cache.

=== GPU ===
The BCM2711 integrates a VideoCore VI GPU, replacing the VideoCore IV used since the original Raspberry Pi. It is clocked at 500 MHz and includes a new Memory Management Unit, allowing it to access more memory despite being a 32-bit GPU. The GPU supports the OpenGL ES 3.1 and Vulkan 1.2 APIs. The multimedia capabilities include hardware decoding of H.265 (4Kp60) and H.264 (1080p60 decode and 1080p30 encode) video.

=== RAM ===
The Raspberry Pi 4 uses LPDDR4 RAM running at 3.2 GHz. It is available in variants with 1, 2, 3, 4 or 8 GB of memory, with the 8 GB model introduced a year after the initial release and the 3 GB model introduced in April 2026.

=== I/O and connectivity ===
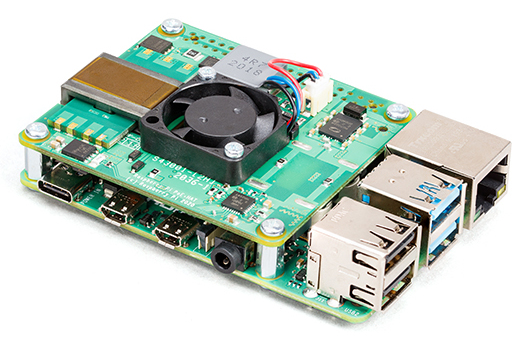
Raspberry Pi 4 with PoE+ HAT

The Raspberry Pi 4 introduced several upgrades to input/output (I/O) capabilities. USB connectivity was improved from four USB 2.0 ports on earlier models to two USB 3.0 ports and two USB 2.0 ports. A dedicated PCI Express bus connects the USB controllers and a natively attached Ethernet controller, enabling true Gigabit Ethernet speeds (on the Raspberry Pi 3 the internal USB 2.0 connection limited speeds to 300 Mbit/s). The single full-sized HDMI port on previous models was replaced by two micro-HDMI ports, allowing for dual-display output. The computer can drive two 4K displays at 30 Hz or one at 60 Hz, while the Pi 5 improves on this with support for two 4K displays at 60 Hz.

The board includes two DSI display ports (only one exposed on the Raspberry Pi 4B) and two CSI camera ports (only one exposed on the Raspberry Pi 4B). It also supports up to six I²C and UART interfaces and up to six SPI interfaces (five exposed on the Raspberry Pi 4B). Bluetooth was updated from version 4.2 to 5.0, and the power input switched from Micro-USB to USB-C. With an optional HAT board installed, the Ethernet port supports Power over Ethernet.

The 4-pole 3.5mm jack supports stereo audio and composite video output, however, it does not support microphone input.

== Compute Module 4 ==
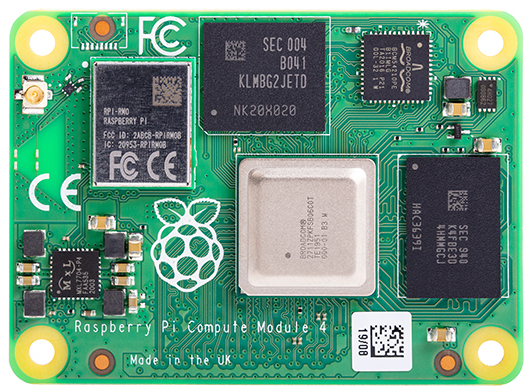
Raspberry Pi Compute Module 4

On 19 October 2020, 16 months after the original release of the Raspberry Pi 4 Model B, Raspberry Pi released the Compute Module 4, a computer-on-module version of the Pi 4 platform designed for embedded and industrial applications. The Compute Module 4, like the original Pi 4 model, features options for 1 GB, 2 GB, 4 GB, and 8 GB of RAM; however, it also features options for 8 GB, 16 GB, or 32 GB of optional eMMC onboard storage. There is also an option for wireless 2.4/5 GHz wireless connectivity. Because of the 32 variations for the Compute Module 4, the MSRP ranges from $30 to $95 depending on the configuration.

It is offered in two formats: the Compute Module 4 with dual 100-pin high-density connectors on the bottom that enable additional interfaces and the Compute Module 4S that uses the same design as earlier Compute Modules matching the physical dimensions of a DDR2 SO-DIMM RAM module (though electrically incompatible with standard SO-DIMM sockets).

Additionally, an extended temperature range variant is offered that can be operated in environments down to −40 °C (−40 °F).

=== I/O and connectivity ===
Unlike the traditional form factor, Compute Modules do not have traditional I/O ports, and instead are meant to connect to another board to provide IO functionality. The connectors on the Compute Modules can be used for the same interfaces as other Pi 4 models and the Compute Module 4 exposes the PCIe 2.0 bus that was previously used for USB 3.0. The freeing of the PCIe bus allows designers to use it for other use cases, such as native NVMe storage or faster networking. Because of its smaller connector, the Compute Module 4S does not support this PCIe functionality, the second HDMI port or Ethernet.

Models of Compute Module 4 that have an eMMC chip do not have the capability to connect to external eMMC or microSD storage.

== Raspberry Pi 400 ==
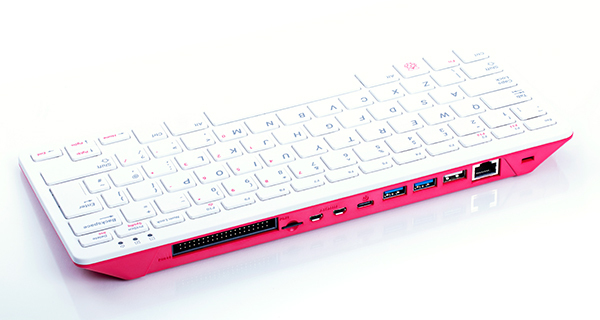
Raspberry Pi 400 keyboard computer

The Raspberry Pi 400 is the final Raspberry Pi product to be based on the Raspberry Pi 4 platform. Released 2 November 2020, the Pi 400 is a Raspberry Pi 4 with 4 GB of RAM in a keyboard form factor. It also has an upgraded power supply and a large integrated heat sink, allowing the ARM Cortex-A72 processor to be clocked at 1.8 GHz.

Intended to be used as a desktop PC, the Raspberry Pi 400 can either be bought alone for $70, or as part of a desktop kit which includes the Pi 400 itself, a power supply, a mouse, a 16 GB microSD card with Raspberry Pi OS preinstalled, and a guide book for $100.

== Peripherals ==
=== Compute Module 4 I/O board ===
The Compute Module 4 I/O Board is an official daughter board designed to give Compute Module 4 users easier access to its various interfaces. While the board does feature many of the same ports as the original Pi 4 Model B, the Compute Module 4 I/O Board also adds and changes various connectivity options.

==== PCI-e 2.0 ====
The CM4 I/O board is a carrier board exposing the PCI-e 2.0 bus of the Compute Module 4, rather than having the bus directly connect to a USB 3.0 controller. The bus is exposed through a standard 1x PCI-e connector, allowing for the connection of standard PCI-e peripherals such as networking cards, high-speed storage devices, and even allows the possibility of external GPU support.

== USB-C power issues ==
During the launch of the original Raspberry Pi 4, people soon discovered that some USB-C power cables would not work with the board. The reason for this was found to be the Pi 4's USB-C power connector being non-compliant with the official specification. The issue stems from the Raspberry Pi 4's use of a shared CC pull-down resistor, rather than each CC line being given its own resistor; the result of this change is that chargers using an e-marker chip will not be able to detect the Pi, thus supplying no voltage.

The USB-C implementation was fixed with the release of the 1.2 revision of the Raspberry Pi 4, which allowed high-speed USB-C cables to work with the board.
