= Fragment processing =

Fragment processing is a term in computer graphics referring to a collection of operations applied to fragments generated by the rasterization operation in the rendering pipeline.

During the rendering of computer graphics, the rasterization step takes a primitive, described by its vertex coordinates with associated color and texture information, and converts it into a set of fragments. These fragments then undergo a series of processing steps, e.g. scissor test, alpha test, depth test, stencil test, blending, texture mapping and so on. These steps are collectively referred to as fragment processing.

== See also ==
- Computer representation of surfaces
- Glossary of computer graphics
- Graphical perception
- Spatial visualization ability
- Visualization (graphics)
