= OpenGL Architecture Review Board =

Former industry consortium

- Founded: 1992
- Founder: Linas Vepstas
- Defunct: 2006
- Fate: Re-branded into Khronos Group
- Successor: Khronos Group
- Products: OpenGL

The OpenGL Architecture Review Board (ARB) was an industry consortium that governed the OpenGL specification. It was formed in 1992, and defined the conformance tests, approved the OpenGL specification and advanced the standard. On July 31, 2006, it was announced that the ARB voted to transfer control of the OpenGL specification to Khronos Group.

Voting members included 3Dlabs, Apple, ATI, Dell, IBM, Intel, Nvidia, SGI and Sun Microsystems, plus other contributing members. Microsoft was an original voting member, but left in March 2003.

== See also ==
- OpenGL
- GLSL
- Khronos Group
- ARB assembly language
