= EON Reality =

American software company

- Industry: Virtual reality, augmented reality
- Founded: 1999; 27 years ago
- Headquarters: Irvine, California
- Area served: Worldwide
- Products: EON-XR; EON Spatial Meetings; EON Merged XR; EON Knowledge Metaverse
- Website: www.eonreality.com

EON Reality is a multinational virtual reality and augmented reality software developer headquartered in Irvine, California. The company was founded by Dan Lejerskar, Mikael Jacobsson and Mats W. Johansson in 1999. Its clients include Boeing, Microsoft, Lexus and Cornell University.

The company has subsidiaries in Gothenburg (Sweden), Singapore, Italy (Bologna), China and Dominican Republic.

== History ==
In 1999, Dan Lejerskar, Mikael Jacobsson and Mats W. Johansson founded EON Reality.

The firm supplied its products for training and development at a technology center in Brazil owned by Senai, a Brazilian industrial apprenticeship service, in September 2010. In March 2013, the firm opened an interactive research and development center in Manchester, England. The company opened its Entrepreneur Coding School to teach coding, 3D modeling, design and development.

In December 2016, EON Reality launched Eon Reality Norway AS and opened locations in Hamar and Elverum in the country.

On 2 July 2020, EON Reality announced that it had entered a strategic relationship with Dell to promote AR and VR products.

=== Education ===
In November 2014, the company partnered with Duncanville, Texas to establish a virtual reality school. In September 2016, it announced a partnership with Eastern Iowa Community Colleges in which it built an educational training center in Davenport, Iowa. The company's Innovation Academy began offering augmented reality design classes in January 2017. The firm reached a partnership with Lehman College in December 2016 to build an Interactive Digital Centre on one of Lehman's satellite campus in the Bronx.

In July 2017, Eastern Iowa Community Colleges was awarded a $748,218 grant to develop a water/wastewater, agriculture technology, and conservation curriculum in partnership with EON Reality.

=== Industry ===
EON Reality licensed Microsoft's Touchlight technology through Microsoft's IP Ventures Program in 2006. The company partnered with the Saudi Commission for Tourism and Antiquities to pioneer turnkey solutions for 3D, virtual reality and augmented reality for Bait Nassief, a UNESCO World Heritage site in April 2015. The following month, ExxonMobil awarded a global commercial license for Immersive 3D Operator Training Simulator technology to EON Reality. In March 2017, EON Reality partnered with the lighting company Tridonic to create an augmented reality interface for the company's IoT industrial lighting technology. That same month, the company's software was used by Epson for a partnership with SO Sofitel Singapore that created an Augmented Reality experience within the hotel.

=== Sports ===
EON Sports, an athletic Virtual Reality training software company, was founded as a subdivision of EON Reality in 2013. EON Sports launched a virtual reality training program for football players in February 2014. UCLA, Ole Miss, Syracuse University, the University of Kansas and 100 high schools are using the software. The Tampa Bay Buccaneers announced that they were using EON Reality's Sidekiq football simulator software for their training camp in July 2015. The New England Patriots, San Francisco 49ers and Dallas Cowboys also invested in the technology.

In November 2015, it was announced that EON Sports partnered with Jason Giambi and created Project OPS, a baseball training solution. The Tampa Bay Rays announced that they will use the EON Sports technology for training. The company's VR tools have also been used as a recruitment tool by college football teams.

In August 2016, it was announced that EON Sports VR would collaborate with the University of Miami to create a virtual reality channel for fans of the university's athletic teams. TAlso in 2016, reached a similar agreement with Pennsylvania State University l. In March 2017, it partnered with the creative agency Twelfthman, Raycom Sports and the ACC men's basketball tournament to present the tournament and related content in virtual reality. That month, it also partnered with Nippon Professional Baseball's Yokohama DeNA BayStars.

== Operations ==
In 2020, EON Reality and its IDCs have 150 employees worldwide. The company develops Virtual Reality (VR) and Augmented Reality (AR) products aimed to improve knowledge transfer. The firm sells its software to corporations, universities, governments and the entertainment industry.

In 2016, it released a free Augmented and Virtual Reality (XR) learning app for Android and iOS called, EON Creator AVR. The app also allows teachers and other users to create learning experiences from the company's library. To date, the library has more than 830,000 assets and lessons. The company released the EON AR Knowledge Injection in April 2017, the update to its AVR platform relies on artificial intelligence, the Internet of Things (IoT), and geolocation to create augmented reality annotations tied to objects in the real world.
