= MoltenVK =

Graphics software library for macOS

- Developers: The Brenwill Workshop Ltd., Khronos Group
- Release: February 26, 2018; 8 years ago
- Stable release: 1.4.2 / 30 November 2025; 11 months ago
- Written in: Objective-C++, Objective-C, C++, C
- Operating system: macOS, iOS, tvOS
- Platform: Cross-platform
- Type: Wrapper library
- License: Apache License 2.0
- Website: moltengl.com/moltenvk
- Repository: github.com/KhronosGroup/MoltenVK

MoltenVK is a software library which allows Vulkan applications to run on top of Metal on Apple's macOS, iOS, and tvOS operating systems. It is the first software component to be released for the Vulkan Portability Initiative, a project to have a subset of Vulkan run on platforms lacking native Vulkan drivers.

There are some limitations compared with a native Vulkan implementation.

It was deprecated by Khronos Group on October 13, 2026. The development is now entirely handled by its community, and not by Khronos Group. They recommended to use KosmicKrisp instead of MoltenVK for Apple silicon processors.

== History ==
MoltenVK was first released as a proprietary and commercially licensed product by The Brenwill Workshop on July 27, 2016.

On July 31, 2017, Khronos announced the formation of the Vulkan Portability Technical Subgroup.

=== Open source ===
On February 26, 2018, Khronos announced that Vulkan became available on macOS and iOS products through the MoltenVK library. Valve announced that Dota 2 will run on macOS using the Vulkan API with the aid of MoltenVK, and that they had made an arrangement with developer The Brenwill Workshop Ltd to release MoltenVK as open-source software under the Apache License version 2.0.

On May 30, 2018, Qt was updated with Vulkan for Qt on macOS using MoltenVK. On May 31, 2018, optional Vulkan support for Dota 2 on macOS was released. Benchmarks for the game were available the following day, showing better performance using Vulkan and MoltenVK compared to OpenGL. On July 20, 2018, Wine was updated with Vulkan support on macOS using MoltenVK. On 29 July 2018, the first app using MoltenVK was accepted onto the App Store, after initially being rejected. On 6 August 2018, Google open-sourced Filament, a crossplatform real-time physically based rendering engine with MoltenVK for macOS/iOS. On November 28, 2018, Valve released Artifact, their first Vulkan-only game on macOS using MoltenVK.

=== Version 1.0 ===
On 29 January 2019, MoltenVK 1.0.32 was released with early prototype of Vulkan Portability Extensions. RPCS3 and Dolphin emulators were updated with Vulkan support on macOS using MoltenVK. On 13 April 2019, MoltenVK 1.0.34 was released with support for tessellation. On July 30, 2019, MoltenVK 1.0.36 was released targeting Metal 3.0. On July 31, 2020, MoltenVK 1.0.44 was released, adding support for the tvOS platform. On January 23, 2020, MoltenVK was updated to support for some of the new features of Vulkan 1.2, as of Vulkan SDK 1.2.121.

=== Version 1.1 ===
On October 1, 2020, MoltenVK 1.1.0 was released, adding full support for Vulkan 1.1, as of Vulkan SDK 1.2.154.

On 9 December 2020, MoltenVK 1.1.1 was released, providing support for Vulkan on Apple silicon GPUs and support for the Mac Catalyst platform for porting iOS/iPadOS apps to macOS.

=== Version 1.2 ===
On October 18, 2022, MoltenVK 1.2.0 was released, adding full support for Vulkan 1.2 as of Vulkan SDK 1.3.231.

In January 2023, MoltenVK 1.2.2 added support for Vulkan as of SDK 1.3.239, while this version of Vulkan SDK fixed some issues with the interconnectivity with Metal API, while version 1.2.3 supported some additional extensions.

=== Version 1.3 ===
On May 1, 2025, MoltenVK 1.3 was released with support for Vulkan 1.3.

=== Version 1.4 ===
On August 20, 2025, MoltenVK 1.4 was released with support for Vulkan 1.4.

== See also ==
- Vulkan
- OpenGL
- Darling (software)
