= Metal (API) =

iOS, macOS, and tvOS graphics rendering API

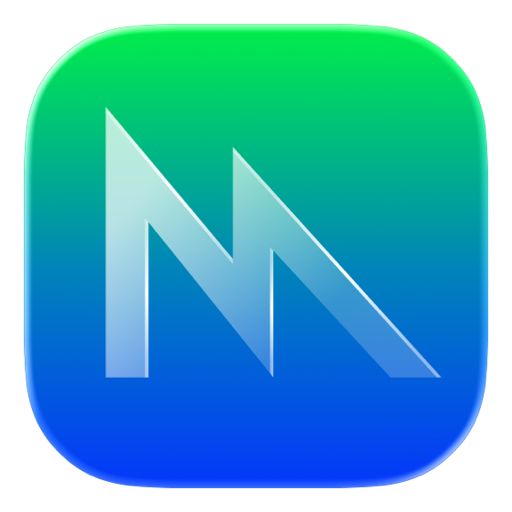

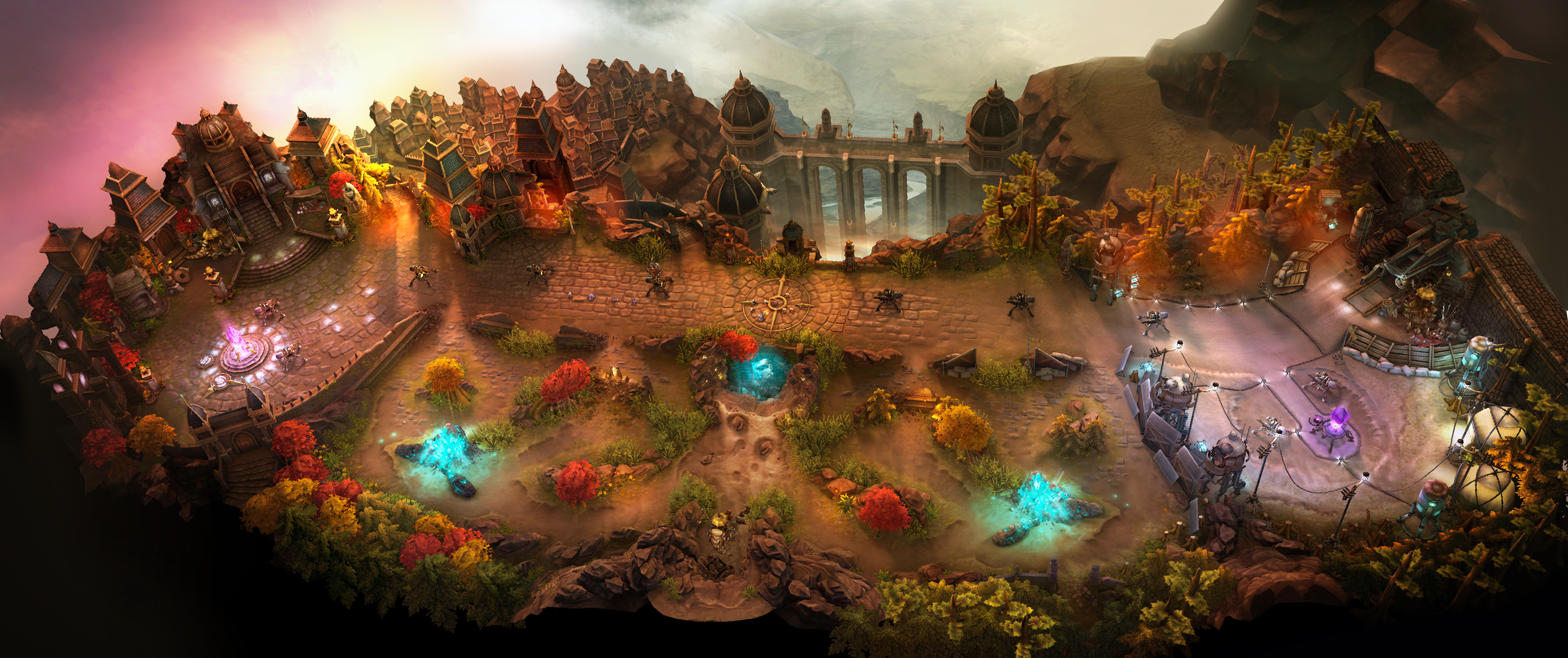
- Apple used the mobile multiplayer online battle arena game Vainglory to demonstrate Metal's graphics capabilities at the iPhone 6's September 2014 announcement event.
- Developer: Apple Inc.
- Release: June 2014; 12 years ago
- Stable release: 4 / June 2025; 1 year ago
- Written in: Metal Shading Language (C++14-based in Metal 1–3, C++17-based in Metal 4), Metal GPU Drivers: C/C++, Metal Runtime: Objective-C, C/C++, Metal API: Objective-C, Swift, C++ (binding via metal-cpp)
- Operating system: iOS, iPadOS, macOS, tvOS and visionOS
- Type: 3D graphics and compute API
- License: Proprietary
- Website: developer.apple.com/metal/

Metal is a low-level, low-overhead hardware-accelerated 3D graphic and compute shader API created by Apple, debuting in iOS 8. Metal combines functions similar to OpenGL and OpenCL in one API. It is intended to improve performance by offering low-level access to the GPU hardware for apps on iOS, iPadOS, macOS, tvOS and visionOS (though not watchOS). It is similar to low-level APIs on other platforms such as Vulkan and DirectX 12.

Metal is an object-oriented API that can be invoked using the Swift, Objective-C or C++17 programming languages. Shaders and compute kernels are written in the Metal Shading Language (MSL), a C++-based language.

== Features ==
Metal aims to provide low-overhead access to the GPU. Commands are encoded beforehand and then submitted to the GPU for asynchronous execution. The application controls when to wait for the execution to complete thus allowing application developers to increase throughput by encoding other commands while commands are executed on the GPU or save power by explicitly waiting for GPU execution to complete. Additionally, command encoding is CPU independent thus applications can encode commands to each CPU thread independently. Lastly, render states are pre-computed beforehand, allowing the GPU driver to know in advance how to configure and optimize the render pipeline before command execution.

Metal improves the capabilities of GPGPU programming by using compute shaders. Metal uses a specific shading language based on C++14, implemented using Clang and LLVM.

Metal allows application developers to create Metal resources such as buffers and textures. Resources can be allocated on the CPU, GPU, or both and provides facilities to update and synchronize allocated resources. Metal can also enforce a resource's state during a command encoder's lifetime.

On macOS, Metal can provide application developers the discretion to specify which GPU to execute. Application developers can choose between the low-power integrated GPU of the CPU, the discrete GPU (on certain MacBooks and Macs) or an external GPU connected through Thunderbolt. Application developers also have the preference on how GPU commands are executed on which GPUs and provides suggestion on which GPU a certain command is most efficient to execute (commands to render a scene can be executed by the discrete GPU while post-processing and display can be handled by the integrated GPU).

=== Metal Performance Shaders ===
Metal Performance Shaders is a highly optimized library of graphics functions that can help application developers achieve great performance at the same time decrease work on maintaining GPU family specific functions. It provides functions including:

- Image filtering algorithms
- Neural network processing
- Advanced math operations
- Ray tracing

== History ==
Metal has been available since June 2, 2014 on iOS devices powered by Apple A7 or later, and since June 8, 2015 on Macs (2012 models or later) running OS X El Capitan.

On June 5, 2017, at WWDC, Apple announced the second version of Metal, to be supported by macOS High Sierra, iOS 11 and tvOS 11. Metal 2 is not a separate API from Metal and is supported by the same hardware. Metal 2 enables more efficient profiling and debugging in Xcode, accelerated machine learning, lower CPU workload, support for virtual reality on macOS, and specificities of the Apple A11 GPU, in particular.

At the 2020 WWDC, Apple announced the migration of the Mac to Apple silicon. Macs using Apple silicon will feature Apple GPUs with a feature set combining what was previously available on macOS and iOS, and will be able to take advantage of features tailored to the tile based deferred rendering (TBDR) architecture of Apple GPUs.

At the 2022 WWDC, Apple announced the third version of Metal (Metal 3), which would debut with the release of macOS Ventura, iOS 16 and iPadOS 16. Metal 3 introduces the MetalFX upscaling framework, which renders complex scenes in less time per frame with high-performance upscaling and anti-aliasing, mesh shaders support. Also announced possibility to use C/C++ for Metal API.

At the 2023 WWDC, Apple announced a brand new toolkit called the Game Porting Toolkit to port Windows 10/11-based games. It includes an environment to test binaries, translation layers from HLSL to MSL, and Metal-cpp bindings. Jeremy Sandmel announced a new Game Mode for macOS Sonoma, and Hideo Kojima announced Death Stranding for the macOS App Store.

At the 2024 WWDC, Apple announced Game Porting Toolkit 2, along with the release of new games such as Control: Ultimate Edition, Frostpunk 2, and Assassin's Creed Shadows for macOS.

At the 2025 WWDC, Apple announced Metal 4, a new version of the API featuring a unified command encoder system, support for neural rendering, and new technologies such as MetalFX Frame Interpolation and a ray tracing denoiser.

== Supported GPUs ==
The first version of Metal supports the following hardware and software:

- Apple A7 SoC or later with iOS 8 or later
- Apple M1 SoC or later with macOS 11 or later
- Intel Processor with Intel HD and Iris Graphics Ivy Bridge series or later with OS X 10.11 or later
- AMD Graphics with GCN or RDNA architecture with OS X 10.11 or later
- NVIDIA Graphics with Kepler architecture with OS X 10.11 to macOS 11 operating system
- NVIDIA Graphics with Maxwell architecture or Pascal architecture with OS X 10.11 to macOS 10.13 operating system

While the above GPUs support a subset of the second version, Metal 2 is fully supported on the following hardware and software:

- Apple A11 SoC or later with iOS 11 or later
- Apple M1 SoC or later with macOS 11 or later
- Intel Processor with Intel HD and Iris Graphics Skylake series or later with macOS 10.13 or later
- AMD Graphics with GCN or RDNA architecture with macOS 10.13 or later

The third version of Metal supports the following hardware and software:

- Apple A13 or later with iOS 16, iPadOS 16
- Apple A14 or later with iOS 16, iPadOS 16 or later
- Apple M1 SoC or later with iPadOS 16 or later
- Apple M1 SoC or later with macOS 13 or later
- Intel Processor with Intel UHD 630 or Iris Plus (Kaby Lake or later) with macOS 13 or later
- AMD Graphics with RDNA architecture (5000 and 6000 series) and Pro Vega (5th generation GCN architecture)

The fourth version of Metal supports the following hardware and software:

- Apple A14 or later with iOS 26, iPadOS 26 or later
- Apple M1 SoC or later with iPadOS 26, macOS 26 or later

== Adoption ==
According to Apple, more than 148,000 applications use Metal directly, and 1.7 million use it through high-level frameworks, as of June 2017. macOS games using Metal for rendering are listed below.

Title	Developer (macOS version)	Game engine	MacOS release date (OpenGL/DirectX)	Metal-based release date	Metal support notes
Ark: Survival Evolved	Studio Wildcard	Unreal Engine 4		29 August 2017	
Assassin's Creed Shadows	Ubisoft Quebec	Ubisoft Anvil		20 March 2025	
ARMA 3	Virtual Programming	Real Virtuality	31 August 2015		Metal support in beta since 17 September 2017
Baldur's Gate III	Larian Studios	Divinity Engine 4.0		22 September 2023	Metal support in early access since 6 October 2020
Ballistic Overkill	Aquiris Game Studio	Unity Engine 5		28 March 2017	
Batman: Arkham City	Feral Interactive	Unreal Engine 3	18 October 2013		Metal support since 21 February 2019 with v1.2
Batman: The Enemy Within	Telltale Games	Telltale Tool		8 August 2017	
BattleTech	Harebrained Schemes	Unity Engine 5		24 April 2018	
Bioshock Remastered	Feral Interactive	Unreal Engine 2.5		22 August 2017	
Bioshock 2 Remastered	Feral Interactive	Unreal Engine 2.5		22 October 2020	
Cyberpunk 2077	CD Projekt	REDengine 4		17 July 2025	Support for Metal 4
Cities: Skylines	Paradox Interactive	Unity Engine 5	10 March 2015		Metal support since 18 May 2017
Civilization VI	Aspyr Media	LORE	24 October 2016		Metal support since 5 April 2019
Company of Heroes 2	Feral Interactive	Essence Engine 3	21 January 2015		Metal support since 19 October 2018
Control: Ultimate Edition	Remedy Entertainment	Northlight Engine		26 March 2025	
Dead Island 2	Dambuster Studios	Unreal Engine 4		24 July 2025	
Deus Ex: Mankind Divided	Feral Interactive	Dawn Engine		12 December 2017	
DiRT Rally	Feral Interactive	EGO Engine 2.5		16 November 2017	
Divinity: Original Sin II	Larian Studios	Divinity Engine 2		31 January 2019	
Dota 2	Valve	Source 2	18 July 2013		MoltenVK was announced on 26 February 2018. The option to use this became available on 31 May 2018.
The Elder Scrolls Online	Zenimax Online Studios	N/A	4 April 2014	22 October 2018	OpenGL Renderer replaced with Vulkan via MoltenVK wrapper (translates Vulkan API calls to Metal) in patch 4.2.5
Empire: Total War	Feral Interactive	TW Engine 3	4 March 2009		Metal support since 16 December 2019
EVE Online	CCP Games	N/A	6 November 2007	14 October 2021	Previously available on macOS via DirectX 9.0 from November 2007 until February 2009; native macOS version using Metal released 14 November 2021
Everspace	Rockfish	Unreal Engine 4		26 May 2017	
F1 2016	Feral Interactive	EGO Engine 4.0		6 April 2017	
F1 2017	Feral Interactive	EGO Engine 4.0		25 August 2017	
Fortnite	Epic Games	Unreal Engine 4		25 July 2017	
Frostpunk	11 Bit Studios	Liquid Engine		24 February 2021	
Frostpunk 2	11 Bit Studios	Unreal Engine 5		20 September 2024	
Gravel	Virtual Programming	Unreal Engine 4		20 January 2019	
Guardians of the Galaxy: The Telltale Series	Telltale Games	Telltale Tool		18 April 2017	
Headlander	Double Fine Productions	Buddha Engine		18 November 2016	
Heroes of the Storm	Blizzard Entertainment	SC2 Engine	2 June 2015		Metal support in beta since 24 January 2017 (temporarily removed on 29 November 2017 until ?)
Hitman	Feral Interactive	Glacier 2		20 June 2017	
Hollow Knight	Team Cherry	Unity Engine		11 April 2017	
Hollow Knight: Silksong	Team Cherry	Unity Engine		4 September 2025	
Life Is Strange: Before the Storm	Feral Interactive	Unity Engine		13 September 2018	
Life Is Strange 2	Feral Interactive	Unreal Engine 4		2019	
Mafia III	Aspyr Media	Illusion Engine		11 May 2017	
Medieval II: Total War	Feral Interactive	TW Engine 2	17 December 2015		Metal support since 25 October 2018
Micro Machines World Series	Virtual Programming	Unity Engine 5		30 June 2017	
Minecraft: Story Mode - Season Two	Telltale Games	Telltale Tool		11 July 2017	
MXGP3	Virtual Programming	Unreal Engine 4		23 November 2018	
Napoleon: Total War	Feral Interactive	TW Engine 3	2 July 2013		Metal support since 25 October 2019 with v1.2
Obduction	Cyan Worlds	Unreal Engine 4		29 March 2017	
Observer	Bloober Team	Unreal Engine 4		24 October 2017	
Quake II	id Software	Quake II engine		9 February 2019	A port using MoltenVK was released as vkQuake2.
Refunct	Dominique Grieshofer	Unreal Engine 4		5 September 2016	
Resident Evil 2	Capcom	RE Engine		10 December 2024	
Resident Evil 3	Capcom	RE Engine		18 March 2025	
Resident Evil 4	Capcom	RE Engine		20 December 2023	
Resident Evil Village	Capcom	RE Engine		28 October 2022	First macOS game with MetalFX support
Rise of the Tomb Raider	Feral Interactive	Foundation Engine		12 April 2018	
Shadow of the Tomb Raider	Feral Interactive	Foundation Engine		2019	
Sid Meier's Railroads!	Feral Interactive	Gamebryo	1 November 2012		Metal support since 18 December 2018
The Sims 3	Maxis Redwood Shores	The Sims 3 Engine	2 June 2009	28 October 2020	
The Sims 4	Maxis	SmartSim	17 February 2015		Metal support added 12 November 2019
Sky: Children of the Light	Thatgamecompany	N/A		18 July 2019	Native Metal support added since pre-global live in November 2017
Starcraft	Blizzard Entertainment	Modified Warcraft II engine	20 November 2001		Metal support since 2 July 2020 with v1.23.5
StarCraft II	Blizzard Entertainment	SC2 Engine	27 July 2010		Metal support in beta since 24 January 2017
Tomb Raider	Feral Interactive	Foundation Engine	17 January 2014		Metal support with v1.2 in July 2019
Total War: Rome Remastered	Feral Interactive	TW Engine 2		29 April 2021	
Total War: Shogun 2	Feral Interactive	TW Engine 3	31 July 2014		Metal support since 4 October 2019
Total War: Shogun 2: Fall of the Samurai	Feral Interactive	TW Engine 3	18 December 2014		Metal support since 4 October 2019
Total War: Three Kingdoms	Feral Interactive	TW Engine 3		23 May 2019	
Total War: Warhammer	Feral Interactive	TW Engine 3		19 April 2017	
Total War: Warhammer II	Feral Interactive	TW Engine 3		20 November 2018	
Total War Saga: Thrones of Britannia	Feral Interactive	TW Engine 3		24 May 2018	
Total War Saga: Troy	Feral Interactive	TW Engine 3		13 August 2020	
Transport Fever 2	Urban Games	N/A		23 February 2021	Metal support using MoltenVK and OpenGL
Universe Sandbox	Giant Army	Unity Engine 5	TBA		Metal support in beta since June 2017
Unreal Tournament	Epic Games	Unreal Engine 4	Cancelled		Metal support since January 2017
War Thunder	Gaijin Entertainment	Dagor Engine 4	1 November 2012		Metal support added 24 May 2017 (removed in ? 2018 and reintroduced 27 August 2020)
Warhammer 40,000: Dawn of War III	Feral Interactive	Essence Engine 4		9 June 2017	
The Witness	Thekla, Inc	Thekla Engine		8 March 2017	
World of Warcraft	Blizzard Entertainment	WoW Engine	23 November 2004		Metal support since August 2016
X-Plane 11	Laminar Research	N/A	30 May 2017		Metal support in beta since 2 April 2020

== See also ==
- Direct3D – DirectX 12 introduces low-level APIs.
- Mantle – low-level API by AMD
- Vulkan – low-overhead successor to OpenGL
- MoltenVK - software compatibility library to run Vulkan software on top of the Metal API
- WebGPU
- OpenGL - cross-platform graphics API
