= JrMan =

Open-source renderer for 3D objects

jrMan

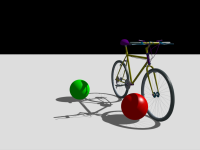
- Screenshot of jrMan 0.4
- Developer: jrMan Team
- Stable release: 0.4 / February 20, 2007
- Operating system: Cross-platform
- Platform: Java
- Type: Renderer
- Licence: GPL
- Website: https://www.jrman.org/

jrMan renderer is an open-source version of the Reyes rendering algorithm used by Pixar's PhotoRealistic RenderMan and implemented in Java by Gerardo Horvilleur, Jorge Vargas, Elmer Garduno, and Alessandro Falappa.

jrMan is available under the GNU General Public License (GPL).

== Current version ==
Release 0.4

=== Features ===
Shadows, texture mapping, surface shaders, light shaders, volume shaders, displacement shaders, all pixel filters, generate image to file (RGB & RGBA), delayed Read Archive.

=== Supported primitives ===
Sphere, Torus, Cone, Disk, Cylinder, Paraboloid, Hyperboloid, Points, Patch "bilinear" and "bicubic" (all basis & rational), Polygon, PointsPolygon, ObjectInstance, PatchMesh, NuPatch, Curves "linear" and "cubic" (also rational).

=== Features not yet implemented ===
Shading language compiler, motion blur, depth of field, level of detail, CSG, trim curves, subdivision surfaces, general polygons.

== See also ==
- RenderMan Interface Specification
