= Autodesk Arnold =

3D rendering software developed by Autodesk

Arnold
- Original author: Marcos Fajardo
- Developers: Solid Angle, Autodesk, Sony Pictures Imageworks
- Initial release: 1998; 28 years ago
- Stable release: 7.5.1.1 / 20 April 2026; 1 day's time
- Written in: C++, CUDA
- Operating system: Linux, Windows, macOS
- Platform: x86-64, Apple M series, CUDA-enabled NVIDIA
- Type: Rendering system
- License: Proprietary commercial software
- Website: www.autodesk.com/products/arnold/overview

Autodesk Arnold (also known as simply Arnold) is a computer program for rendering three-dimensional, computer-generated scenes using unbiased, physically-based, Monte Carlo path tracing techniques. Created in Spain by Marcos Fajardo, it was later co-developed by his company Solid Angle SL (now owned by Autodesk) and Sony Pictures Imageworks.

Arnold is one of the most widely used photorealistic rendering systems in computer graphics worldwide, particularly in animation and VFX for film and television.

== Technology ==
Originally written in C99 and progressively rewritten in C++, Arnold runs natively on x86 and Apple CPUs, where it tries to take advantage of all available threads and SIMD lanes for optimal parallelism. Since March 2019 it supports Nvidia RTX-powered GPUs through the use of OptiX.

Its ray tracing engine is optimized to send billions of spatially incoherent rays throughout a 3D scene composed of geometric primitives including polygons, hair splines, and volumes. It often uses multiple levels of diffuse and specular inter-reflection so that light can bounce off of a wall or other object and indirectly illuminate a subject. For complex scenes such as the space station in Elysium, it makes heavy use of geometry instancing, which helps it render trillions of visible polygons in a reasonable amount of memory. It can render large numbers of high-resolution texture maps thanks to its efficient integration of the OpenImageIO library. It has a fully programmable API, and uses shaders written in C++ or Open Shading Language to define the materials and textures.

Arnold is based on the Monte Carlo Path Tracing algorithm, making extensive use of importance sampling and other numerical techniques to improve the quality of rendered images. Throughout the 2010s, its team published research that popularized the use of solid angle-based sampling of area lights in production rendering, equi-angular sampling for volumetric scattering, ray-traced sub-surface scattering, and blue-noise dithered sampling.

== History ==
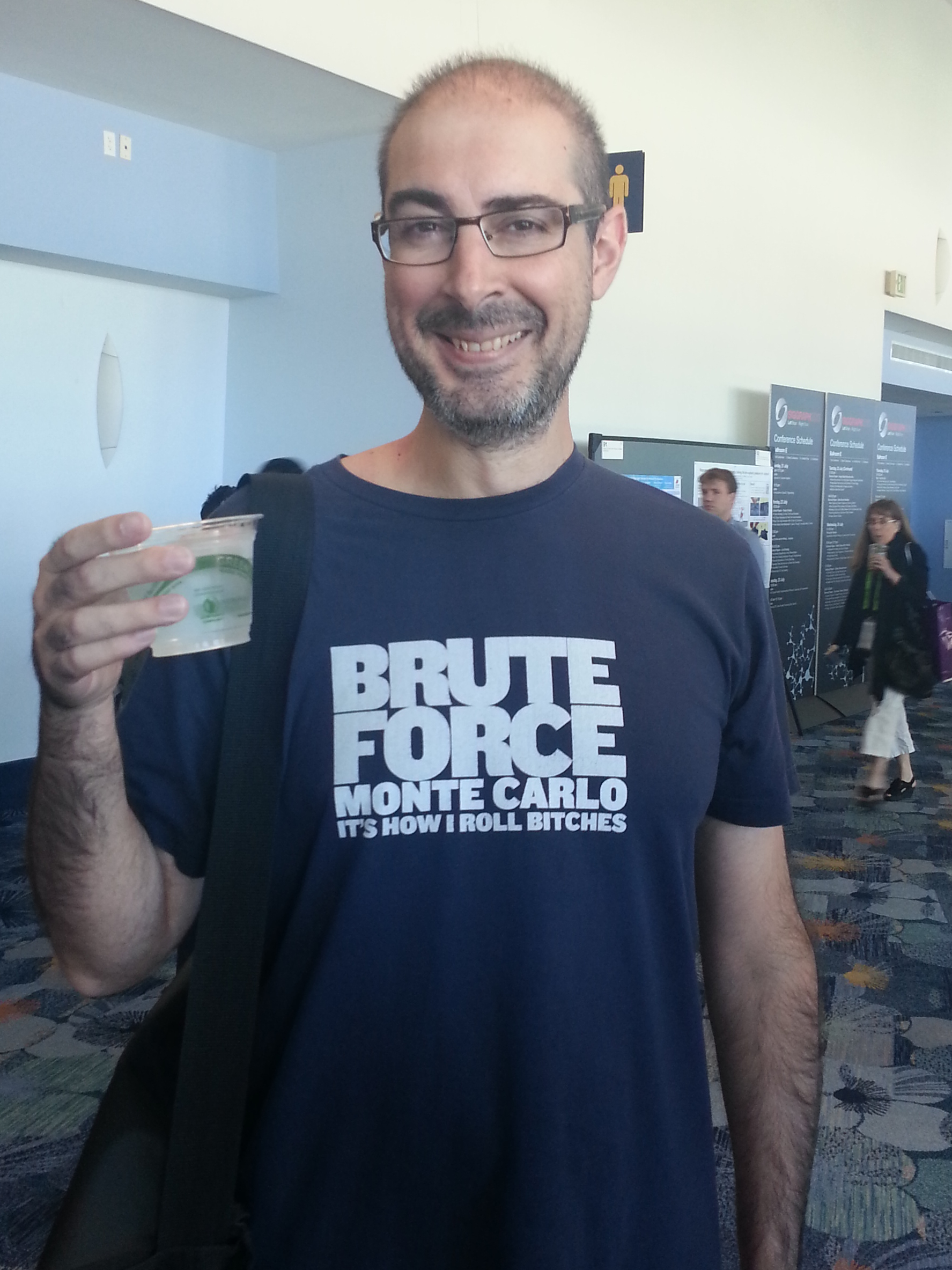
Marcos Fajardo at SIGGRAPH 2013 in Anaheim, CA

Marcos Fajardo was the chief architect of Arnold until 2020. The beginnings of what is now Arnold emerged in 1997 when Fajardo decided to write his own renderer. That year, he attended SIGGRAPH, where his interest in stochastic ray tracing (a foundational part of Arnold's rendering technology) was piqued in discussions with friends attending the conference.

Early versions of Fajardo's renderer were called RenderAPI. The name Arnold emerged when one of Fajardo's friends suggested it after mocking an Arnold Schwarzenegger film they saw in a theater. As an homage to the action movie star, Arnold's command line program is named kick and its input files have the .ass file extension, for Arnold Scene Source. Arnold's developers and users refer to its usage as "kick[ing] ass."

In 2004, Fajardo entered a licensing and co-development agreement with Sony Pictures Imageworks, which resulted in separate branches for the commercial and Sony-proprietary versions of Arnold. The commercial version was integrated via plug-ins into several DCC packages including Softimage, Maya, Katana, Cinema4D, and Houdini.

Solid Angle SL, the company behind Arnold, was founded in 2009 in Madrid and purchased by Autodesk in early 2016. The acquisition was announced officially on April 18, 2016. Arnold is now bundled with Maya and 3ds Max.

== Awards ==
On 4 January 2017, the Academy of Motion Picture Arts and Sciences recognized Fajardo with a Scientific and Engineering award (Academy plaque) for "the creative vision and original implementation of the Arnold Renderer."

On 21 October 2021, the Television Academy recognized Fajardo, along with colleagues Alan King and Thiago Ize, with an Engineering Emmy statuette for the Arnold Global Illumination Rendering System.

On 1 December 2023, as part of the first CVMP Technical Awards, Fajardo received a CVMP Implementation Award for Arnold, "to individual(s) who have taken academic research and then have pioneered in a timely manner a tool that implements that research in a novel way."

== Shows ==
Notable feature films that have used Arnold include Monster House, Cloudy with a Chance of Meatballs, Alice in Wonderland, Thor, Captain America, X-Men: First Class, The Avengers, Space Pirate Captain Harlock, Elysium, Pacific Rim, Gravity, Guardians of the Galaxy, Star Wars: The Force Awakens, Arrival and Blade Runner 2049.

Notable television series include Game of Thrones, Westworld, Trollhunters, LOVE DEATH + ROBOTS, Foundation, The Mandalorian, Monarch: Legacy of Monsters, and 3 Body Problem.

== Notable studios using Arnold ==
Country	Studio
Australia	Rising Sun Pictures
Canada	Sony Pictures Imageworks
Canada	Rodeo FX
Canada	Image Engine
Canada	Hybride technologies
France	Mikros Image
Germany	Trixter
Germany	Pixomondo
Germany	LAVAlabs Moving Images
Hungary	Digic Pictures
India	Prana Studios
Japan	Marza Animation Planet
Japan	Square Enix
Norway	Storm Studios
Poland	Platige Image
Spain	Skydance Animation Madrid
Spain	El Ranchito
United Kingdom	Cinesite
United Kingdom	The Mill
United States	Luma Pictures
United States	Reel FX
United States	Psyop

== See also ==
- Pixar RenderMan
- Vray
