= Matt Pharr =

American computer graphics researcher and writer

Matt Pharr is an American computer graphics researcher and writer, and one of the primary originators of the physically based rendering process. His research focuses on rendering algorithms, graphics processing units, as well as scientific illustration and visualization.

== Education and academic work ==
Pharr graduated with a B.S. in Computer Science from Yale University. He then went on to receive his Ph.D. from the Stanford University Graphics Lab, working under the supervision of Pat Hanrahan on rendering algorithms and systems. He has taught graduate level classes at Stanford, including Image Synthesis.

== Professional career ==
Pharr joined Pixar's Rendering R&D group, working on the RenderMan Interface Specification and the RenderMan Shading Language. While at Pixar he was a Rendering Software Engineer for the films A Bug's Life and Toy Story 2. He then became a co-founder of Exluna, whose flagship product was Entropy, a RenderMan renderer based on BMRT. When Nvidia acquired Exluna and Entropy in early 2002, he worked in their Software Architecture group. Pharr was the founder and the CEO of Neoptica, which worked on new programming models for graphics on heterogeneous CPU+GPU computer systems. Neoptica was acquired by Intel in 2007. That acquisition led him to the newly formed Advanced Rendering Technology group at Intel, where he wrote the ispc SPMD compiler, originally targeting Larrabee. In March 2013 he joined Google, and in May 2018 he moved back to Nvidia to work on real-time rendering using Ray tracing and neural nets.

Anti-aliasing N-rooks sampling from Physically Based Rendering: From Theory To Implementation co-authored by Matt Pharr

== Publications and awards ==
Pharr has received an Academy Award for his work in rendering and computer graphics. He was awarded in 2014, along with Pat Hanrahan and Greg Humphreys, a Technical Achievement Oscar for their formalization and reference implementation of the concepts behind physically based rendering, as shared in their book Physically Based Rendering: From Theory To Implementation. This is the first time this award has been given for a book. He also co-authored GPU Gems 2: Programming Techniques for High-Performance Graphics and General-Purpose Computation during his time at Nvidia.
