= Open Shading Language =

Programming language for rendering images

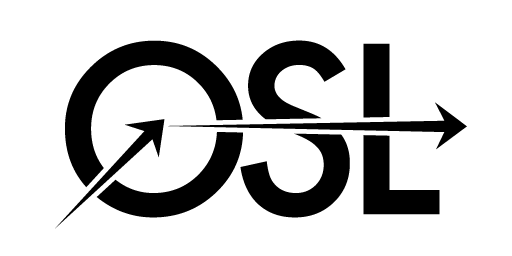
- Developer: Academy Software Foundation
- Release: 12 October 2011; 14 years ago
- Stable release: 1.15.3.0 / 1 April 2026; 4 months ago
- Type: Shading language
- License: BSD license 3-clause
- Website: github/OpenShadingLanguage
- Repository: github.com/AcademySoftwareFoundation/OpenShadingLanguage

Open Shading Language (OSL) is a shading language developed by Sony Pictures Imageworks for use in its Arnold Renderer. It is also supported by Illumination Research's 3Delight renderer, Otoy's Octane Render, V-Ray 3, Redshift (from April 2021), and the Cycles render engine in Blender (starting with Blender 2.65). OSL's surface and volume shaders define how surfaces or volumes scatter light in a way that allows for importance sampling; thus, it is well suited for physically based renderers that support ray tracing and global illumination.

RenderMan has limited OSL support that is used only for patterns; i.e. without any material closure (shading) functionality. It is modified there for better AVX2 and AVX-512 instruction set support with doubled performance.

Release 1.12 supports C++14 as default, but also newer C++17 and C++20. OpenImageIO support will be dropped for 2.0 with support of 2.2. Minimum OpenEXR Version changes up to 2.3. SIMD Batch shader Mode and OptiX support are in development and experimental. CUDA 11 and OptiX 7.1 are here supported levels. 1.12.6 is supported in Blender 3.4. 1.12.6.2 is the first new release of the 1.12 series with a stable API. 1.12.13 is the current version.

== Origin ==
Larry Gritz explains the origin of Open Shading Language:

We had a renderer (Sony Imageworks's fork of the Arnold renderer) where shaders were implemented as C++ plugins, and that had many problems. We desired a shading language for the renderer, and this is the one I designed. In addition to just wanting a language, we also sought to make many improvements over previous shading languages. We explained a lot of the details about the new ideas in this SIGGRAPH 2010 talk 'Open Shading Language'. And apparently, the rest of the industry agreed, because it resulted in an 2017 Academy technical achievement award.

— email from Larry Gritz (2022.06.27)

== Movies ==
Many movies made in 2012 or later have used OSL, including:

- Men in Black 3 (2012)
- The Amazing Spider-Man (2012)
- Hotel Transylvania (2012)
- Edge of Tomorrow (2014)
- Ant-Man (2015)
- Finding Dory (2016)

=== 2017 ===
- The Lego Batman Movie
- The Great Wall
- A Cure for Wellness
- Logan
- Power Rangers
- Life
- Smurfs: The Lost Village
- The Fate of the Furious
- Alien Covenant
- Guardians of the Galaxy 2
- The Mummy
- Wonder Woman
- Cars 3
- Baby Driver
- Spider-Man: Homecoming
- Dunkirk
- The Emoji Movie
- Detroit
- Kingsman: The Golden Circle
- The Lego Ninjago Movie
- Blade Runner 2049
- Geostorm
- Coco
- Justice League
- Thor: Ragnarok

=== 2018 ===
- Peter Rabbit
- Black Panther
- Annihilation
- Red Sparrow
- Pacific Rim Uprising
- Avengers Infinity War
- Deadpool 2
- Incredibles 2
- Jurassic World: Fallen Kingdom
- Hotel Transylvania 3: Summer Vacation
- Ant Man and the Wasp
- Skyscraper
- Mission Impossible: Fallout
- The Meg
- Kin
- Smallfoot
- Alpha
- Venom
- First Man
- Bad Times at the El Royale
- Fantastic Beasts: The Crimes of Grindelwald
- Bohemian Rhapsody
- Holmes and Watson
- Spider-Man: Into the Spider-Verse

=== 2019 ===
- The Kid Who Would Be King
- Alita: Battle Angel
- Lego Movie 2
- "Lucky 13" (an episode of Love, Death & Robots)
- Captain Marvel
- Triple Frontier
- Avengers: Endgame
- Pokémon Detective Pikachu
- Godzilla: King of Monsters
- Rim of the World
- John Wick 3 Parabellum
- Men in Black International
- Toy Story 4
- Spider-Man: Far From Home
- Hobbs & Shaw
- Angry Birds 2
- The Art of Racing in the Rain
- Secret Life of Pets
- The Mandalorian (S1)
- The Dark Crystal: Age of Resistance
- The King
- Jumanji: The Next Level
- Richard Jewell
- Game of Thrones (S8)
- Lost in Space (S1)
- Togo

=== 2020 ===
- Underwater
- Birds of Prey
- Onward
- Bloodshot
- Greyhound
- The Old Guard
- Mulan
- Tenet
- The New Mutants
- Artemis Fowl
- The Eight Hundred
- Over the Moon
- Wonder Woman 1984
- Soul
- The Mandalorian (S2)

=== 2021 ===
- Chaos Walking
- Peter Rabbit 2: The Runaway
- The Falcon and the Winter Soldier
- Secret Magic Control Agency
- Zack Snyder's Justice League
- The Mitchells vs the Machines
- Jupiter's Legacy
- Luca
- F9

== See also ==
- Shading language
- 3Delight
- Arnold Render Engine
- Blender
- Octane Render
- RenderMan
