= Aqsis =

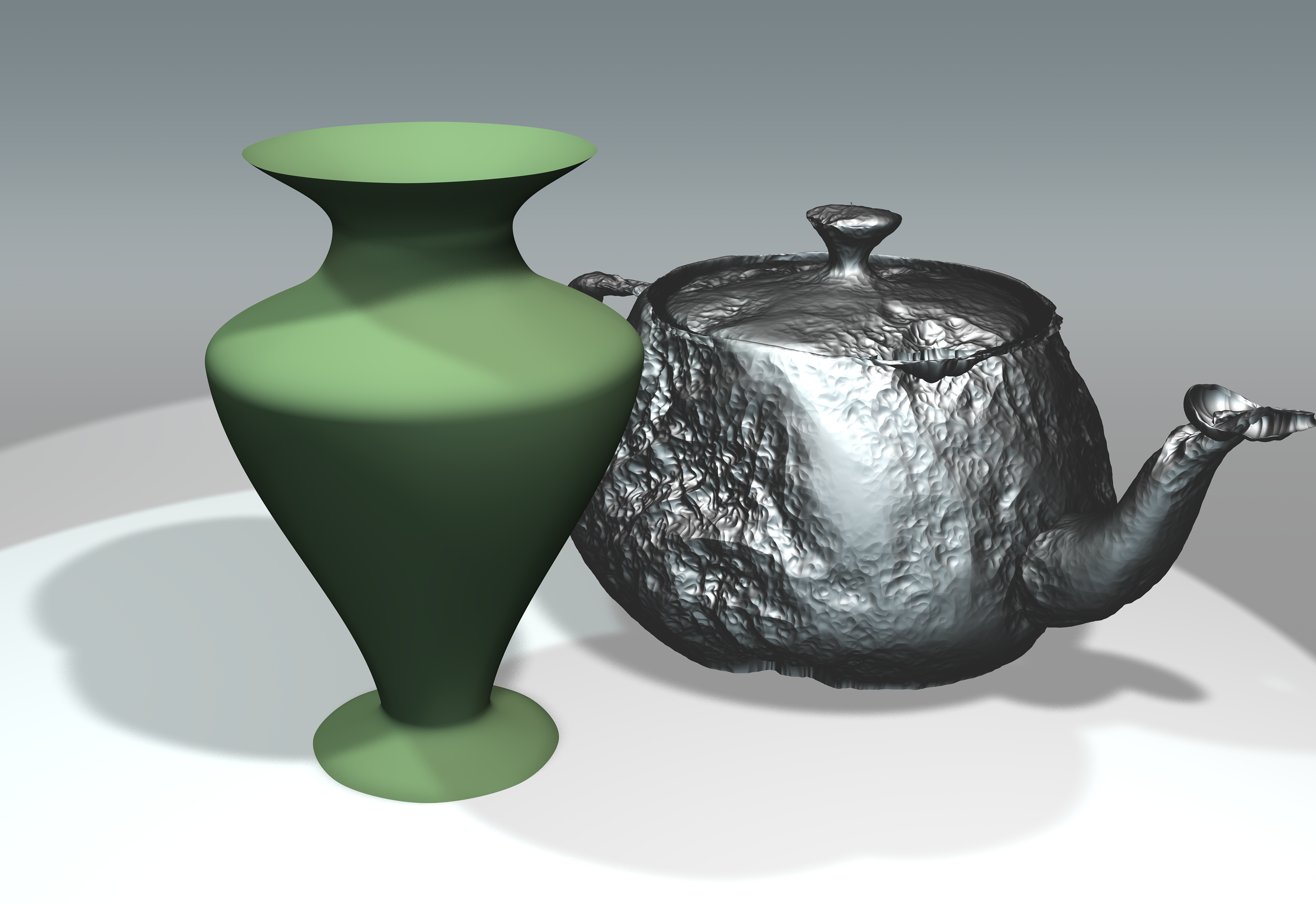
- Aqsis render of the Utah teapot with a displacement shader
- Developer: Paul Gregory
- Stable release: 1.8.2 / August 24, 2012
- Operating system: Windows, Linux, Mac OS X
- License: BSD
- Website: www.aqsis.org
- Repository: git.code.sf.net/p/aqsis/code

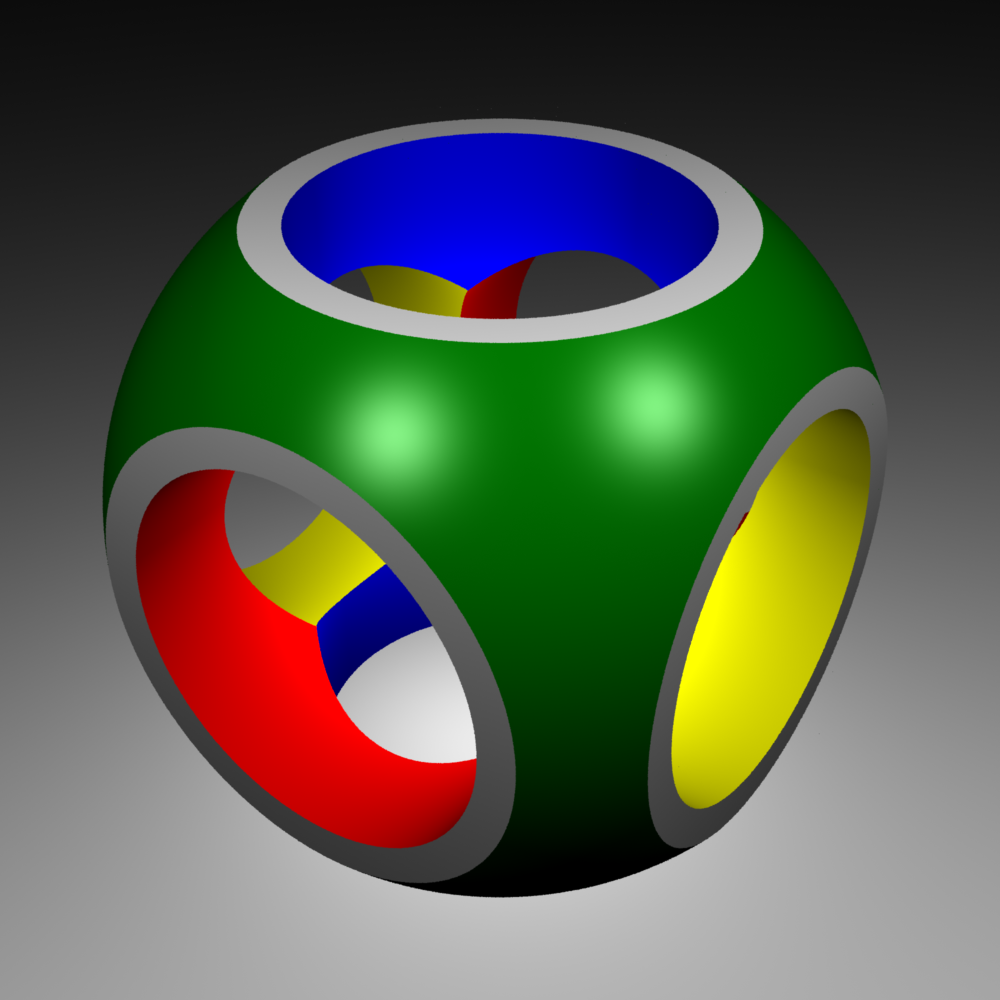
Constructive solid geometry example rendered with Aqsis

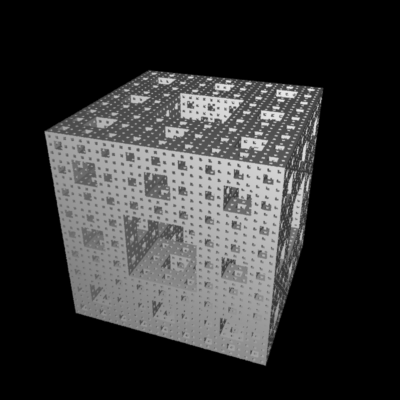
A procedural image rendered with Aqsis

Aqsis is a free rendering suite compliant with the RenderMan standard. It is available under the BSD, previously under GPL. Its main author and project manager is Paul Gregory.

The Aqsis project consists of a renderer, shader compiler and a few other supporting components. Like the original PRMan from Pixar, it is an implementation of the Reyes rendering algorithm, which is famous for its high speed and efficiency in handling even very large scenes, and has good support for displacement shaders. Like many other open source projects, Aqsis is hosted on SourceForge and is in continuous and active development.

Because of its Reyes heritage, Aqsis lacks some advanced global illumination features like ray tracing, although active efforts are underway to support some such features. Its current stable version is 1.8.2.

The MakeHuman project uses Aqsis to produce realistic renderings of the human body.

== Architecture ==
Aqsis implements a REYES architecture using a micropolygon pipeline that dices geometric primitives into sub-pixel quadrilaterals. This pipeline follows a structured flow where shading is performed at the vertices of the micropolygon grid. As a fully functional REYES renderer, Aqsis supports programmable shading and advanced geometric primitives like NURBS, subdivision surfaces, and CSG. To manage memory efficiently, the renderer can handle scenes with millions of polygons by processing them in small "buckets".
