= Peter Schröder =

American computer scientist

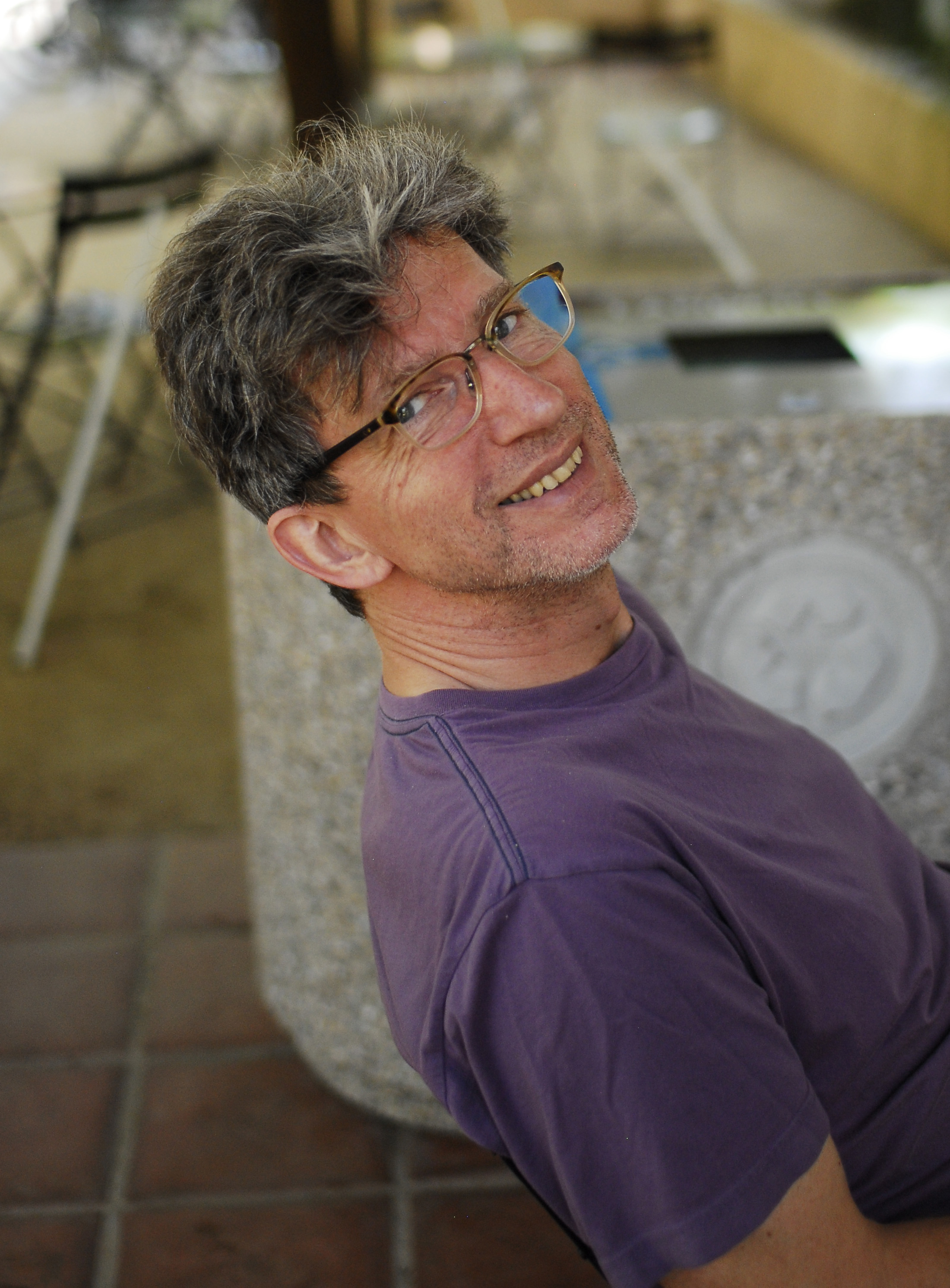
- Peter Schröder at Caltech in May 2013
- Education: Princeton University
- Known for: Discrete differential geometry
- Scientific career
- Fields: Computer Science
- Workplaces: California Institute of Technology
- Doctoral advisor: Pat Hanrahan

Peter Schröder is an American computer scientist and a professor of computer science at California Institute of Technology. Schröder is known for his contributions to discrete differential geometry and digital geometry processing. He is also a world expert in the area of wavelet based methods for computer graphics. In 2015, Schröder was elected as a Fellow of the Association for Computing Machinery for "contributions to computer graphics and geometry processing.".

== Biography ==
Schröder received an M.S. from MIT's Media Lab in 1990, and a Ph.D. in computer science from Princeton University in 1994 under the supervision of Pat Hanrahan. In 1995, he joined the faculty of Caltech. He did his undergraduate work at Technische Universität Berlin in computer science and pure mathematics.

== Awards ==
Schröder is the recipient of an NSF CAREER award, a Sloan Fellowship, a Packard Fellowship, and in 2015 was elected as a fellow of the Association for Computing Machinery. He is also the recipient of the ACM SIGGRAPH Computer Graphics Achievement Award in 2003.
