= 3Delight =

3D computer graphics software

- Developer: Illumination Research
- Initial release: 1999; 27 years ago
- Stable release: 2.9.132 / November 21, 2024
- Operating system: Windows, MacOS, Linux
- Type: 3D computer graphics
- Licence: Proprietary
- Website: www.3delight.com

3Delight, now 3Delight^{NSI}, is a 3D computer graphics software that runs on Windows, macOS (both Intel and Apple Silicon) and Linux (both x86-64 and AWS Graviton). Developed by Illumination Research Pte Ltd, it is both a photorealistic and NPR path tracing offline renderer based on its NSI API scene description and on Open Shading Language for shading. It comes with supported, open source plug-in integrations for several DCC applications, such as Autodesk Maya, Houdini, Cinema4D, Katana, OpenUSD Hydra, and a democratic free license that allows for commercial use. It also provides a fully distributed cloud rendering service called 3Delight Cloud.

== History ==
Work on 3Delight started in 1999. The renderer became first publicly and freely available in 2000. 3Delight was the first RenderMan-compliant renderer combining the REYES algorithm with on-demand ray tracing, pre-dating BMRT.

In March 2005, the license was changed: the first license was free and subsequent licenses were paid. The first company that licensed 3Delight commercially was Rising Sun Pictures in early 2005.

Since 2018, all purchased licenses of 3Delight^{NSI} are unlimited multi-core and the pricing was reduced. The first license is still free; initially limited to four cores/thread, later increased to eight and currently increased to twelve.

As of 2018, Illumination Research, due to the aging of the Renderman Interface (RI), introduced the Nodal Scene Interface (NSI) that replaces the old Renderman one. To reflect such a change the name of the renderer has also been updated to 3Delight^{NSI}. Consequently the new 3Delight^{NSI} renderer is not Renderman-compliant anymore.

== Specifications ==
Until version 10 (2013), 3Delight primarily used the REYES algorithm but was also capable of doing ray tracing and global illumination. As of version 11 (2014), 3Delight primarily used path tracing, with the option to use the REYES and RayTracing when needed along with point-based global illumination. The 3Delight renderer was fully multi-threaded, supported RenderMan Shading Language (RSL) 1.0/2.0 with an optimized compiler and last stage JIT compilation. 3Delight supported distributed rendering. In 2018 3Delight^{NSI} 1.0 was introduced as a forward path tracer based on the new NSI API and using OSL for all shaders and light emitters.
