= Loren Carpenter =

American computer graphics researcher (1947–2025)

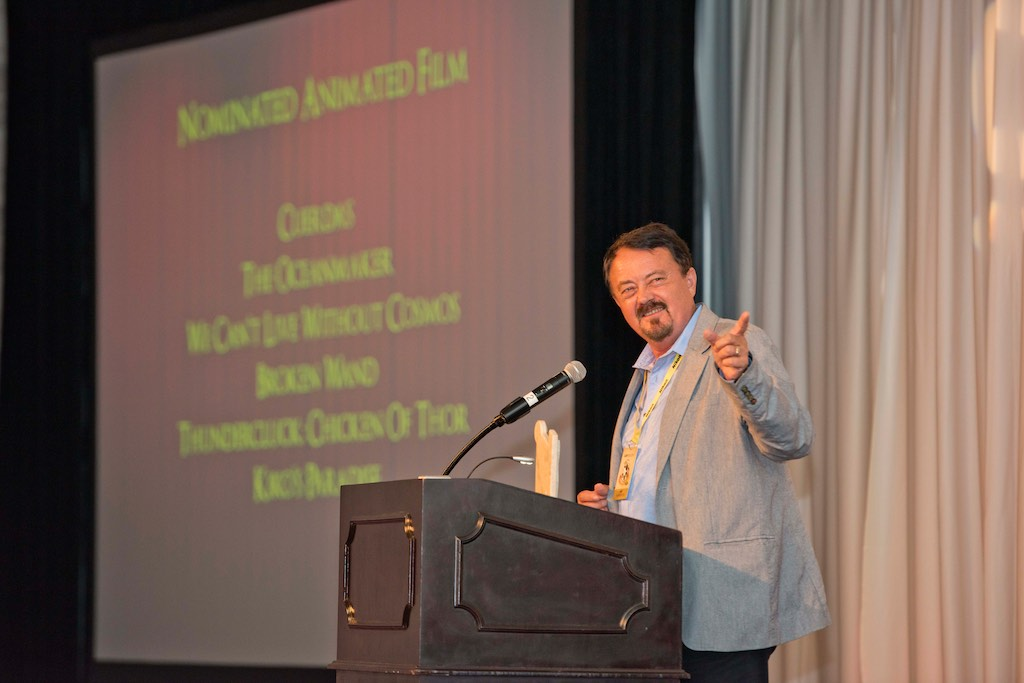
- Born: Loren Carpenter; February 7, 1947; Brighton, Michigan, U.S.
- Died: December 21, 2025 (aged 78)
- Education: B.S. in mathematics, M.S. in computer science
- Alma mater: University of Washington
- Occupation: Computer graphics scientist
- Spouse: Rachel
- Children: 1

Loren Clayton Carpenter (February 7, 1947 – December 21, 2025) was an American computer graphics researcher and developer.

== Life and career ==
Carpenter was born in Brighton, Michigan, on February 7, 1947.

He was a founding employee and chief scientist at Pixar Animation Studios. Carpenter was the co-inventor of the Reyes rendering algorithm and one of the authors of the PhotoRealistic RenderMan software which implements Reyes and renders all of Pixar's movies. He is credited with inventing the name. Following Disney's acquisition of Pixar, Carpenter became a senior research scientist at Disney Research. He retired in early 2014.

In around 1967 Carpenter began work at Boeing Computer Services (a part of aircraft maker Boeing) in Seattle, Washington. During his time there Carpenter studied for a B.S. in mathematics (1974) and an M.S. in Computer Science (1976), both from the University of Washington. Some of his work concerned using computer technology to improve Boeing's mechanical design processes, which were still entirely done by hand on paper.

On July 14, 1980, he gave a presentation at the SIGGRAPH conference, in which he showed "Vol Libre", a 2-minute computer generated movie. This showcased his software for generating and rendering fractally generated landscapes, and was met with a standing ovation, and (as Carpenter had hoped) he was immediately invited to work at Lucasfilm's Computer Division (which would become Pixar). There Carpenter worked on the "genesis effect" scene of Star Trek II: The Wrath of Khan, which featured an entire fractally-landscaped planet.

He and his wife Rachel founded Cinematrix, a company that researches computer-assisted interactive audience participation.

Carpenter invented the A-buffer hidden-surface determination algorithm.

The PXR24 compression scheme used in Industrial Light & Magic's Open EXR file format is based on Carpenter's work.

In 2006 made improvements to the popular Mersenne Twister random number generator.

As of 2022 Carpenter was working with Ostrich Air Inc and FireBot Labs Inc as a Private Investor and Technical Consultant for their Fully Autonomous AI Driven Fire Fighting Drone Platform.

Carpenter died on December 21, 2025, at the age of 78.

From an interview published in IEEE Computer Graphics and Applications Nov.-Dec 2025:

Q: What lessons learned would you like to share?

I followed my passion. I paid attention to the world around me and came back to anything that I found excited me. I had a hell of a lot of fun.

== Computer animation ==
- Star Trek II: The Wrath of Khan (1982) computer graphics: Industrial Light & Magic
- André and Wally B. (1984) 3D rendering
- Tin Toy (1988) elf
- Toy Story (1995) modeling & animation system development/modeling team/renderman software development/shader team
- A Bug's Life (1998) modeling artist
- Toy Story 2 (1999) rendering software engineer
- Monsters, Inc. (2001) additional effects developer
- Finding Nemo (2003) studio tools research and development
- The Incredibles (2004) software engineering
- Cars (2006) development team: Renderman
- Ratatouille (2007) renderman development
- WALL-E (2008): theme parks: Pixar studio team
- Up (2009) theme parks and 360: Pixar studio team
- Toy Story 3 (2010) 360 group: Pixar studio team
- Cars 2 (2011) 360 group: Pixar studio team
- Brave (2012) 360 group: Pixar studio team
- Monsters University (2013) researcher: software research and development, Pixar Studio Team

== Awards ==
- 1985, ACM SIGGRAPH Achievement Award.
- 1992, Scientific and Technical Academy Award (Plaque) for his contributions to the motion picture industry through the invention and development of the RenderMan software.
- 1994, Distinction by the Prix Ars Electronica jury for his entry Kinoetic Evolution in the category Interactive Art.
- 1995, Fellow of the Association for Computing Machinery.
- 2000, Academy Award of Merit (Statuette).
- 2017, Cayman Islands International Film Festival Lifetime Achievement Award

== Bibliography ==
- Loren Carpenter, "The A -buffer, an antialiased hidden surface method", ACM Siggraph Computer Graphics, vol. 18, no. 3, pp. 103–108, 1984
- Robert L. Cook, Loren Carpenter, and Edwin Catmull. "The Reyes image rendering architecture." Computer Graphics (SIGGRAPH '87 Proceedings), pp. 95–102.
- Robert L. Cook, Thomas K. Porter, Loren Carpenter, "Distributed ray tracing", ACM Siggraph Computer Graphics, vol. 18, no. 3, pp. 137–145, 1984
