= Gelato (software) =

GPU/CPU accelerated rendering system

- Developer: Nvidia
- Release: April 19, 2004; 22 years ago
- Final release: 2.2 Release 1 / May 2008; 18 years ago
- Operating system: Windows, Linux
- Predecessor: Blue Moon Rendering Tools, Exluna Entropy
- Successor: mental ray
- Type: 3D computer graphics
- License: Proprietary, freeware
- Website: Nvidia Gelato Zone at the Wayback Machine (archived 2008-05-01)

Gelato is a discontinued CPU/GPU-accelerated offline rendering software product first released in April 2004 by Nvidia, at the time known mainly as a graphics card manufacturer. Designed to produce film-quality images, Gelato uses a shading language very similar to the RenderMan Interface Specification (RISpec). Gelato originally supported Quadro FX GPUs, later adding support for GeForce cards.

It was initially priced at several thousand US dollars (USD) per node. In 2006, Nvidia added a free limited-functionality version. In May 2008 Nvidia announced that it would no longer be developing or supporting Gelato software, releasing a last full-featured version as a free download.

Gelato is notable for being one of the first software applications to use GPU hardware as a compute resource (as opposed to realtime display rendering). It marked the culmination of the BMRT family of RISpec systems, ultimately becoming a freely-available, feature rich rendering package. At the same time, it was a key step in supporting Nvidia's goal to become a leading provider of high-performance compute hardware, and an early move toward providing 3rd-party developers with a standardized API for developing software to use this technology via its CUDA platform.

== History ==
Although Nvidia's first products were dedicated video game graphics cards, its founders' intent from the beginning was to grow beyond that to become a high-performance computing platform provider. One step in this evolution was Nvidia's acquisition of Exluna in 2002, to expand and simplify the ability to use graphics processing units (GPUs) for purposes beyond real-time graphics display. Exluna's main product was Entropy, an enhanced commercial version of Blue Moon Rendering Tools (BMRT), a popular Renderman-compliant photorealistic rendering package.

At Nvidia, Gelato was developed as a functional successor to Entropy by BMRT's original creator Larry Gritz and other former Exluna employees. Unlike Entropy, which was based on BMRT code, Gelato was developed from scratch. It was released in 2004 to support motion picture industry customers by providing software for near-time rendering, one of the two main application target markets for Nvidia Quadro Plex hardware.

To work around the limitations of GPU technology of that time, Nvidia designed Gelato as a hybrid GPU/CPU system, leveraging the advantages of each of the two processing architectures. Gelato was originally priced at US$2,750 per node. In a push to popularize the emerging concept of GPU-accelerated rendering (as opposed to traditional CPU-based rendering), with the release of Gelato 2.0 Nvidia introduced a free version of Gelato for PCs, with some capabilities locked out. The full-featured version was rebranded "Gelato Pro", and was priced at $1,500 per render node, supporting extra features:

- Sorbetto, an interactive relighting technology
- DSO shadeops
- Network parallel rendering
- Multithreading
- Native 64-bit support
- Maintenance and support

In May 2008 Nvidia announced that it would no longer develop or support Gelato software, and released a final version of Gelato Pro as a free download.

== Legacy ==
The Gelato development team was redeployed to the Mental Ray ray tracing software team, which Nvidia had acquired in 2007.

Gelato was described in 2011 as having "paved the way for important advances in GPU computing."

== See also ==
- Cg (programming language)
- OptiX, a later Nvidia CUDA-based ray tracing API
- OpenImageIO
