= Mike Muuss =

American computer programmer and author

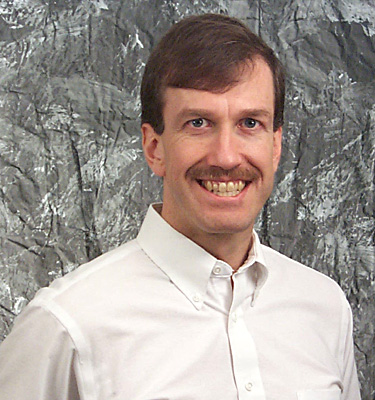
- Mike Muuss in 1999
- Born: Michael John Muuss; October 16, 1958; Iowa City, Iowa
- Died: November 20, 2000 (aged 42); Havre de Grace, Maryland
- Spouse: Susan Pohl

Mike Muuss (left) at the Ballistic Research Laboratory, using BRL-CAD to analyze the M1 prototype, with Earl Weaver (right).

Michael John Muuss (October 16, 1958 – November 20, 2000) was the American author of the freeware network tool ping, as well as the first interactive ray tracing program.

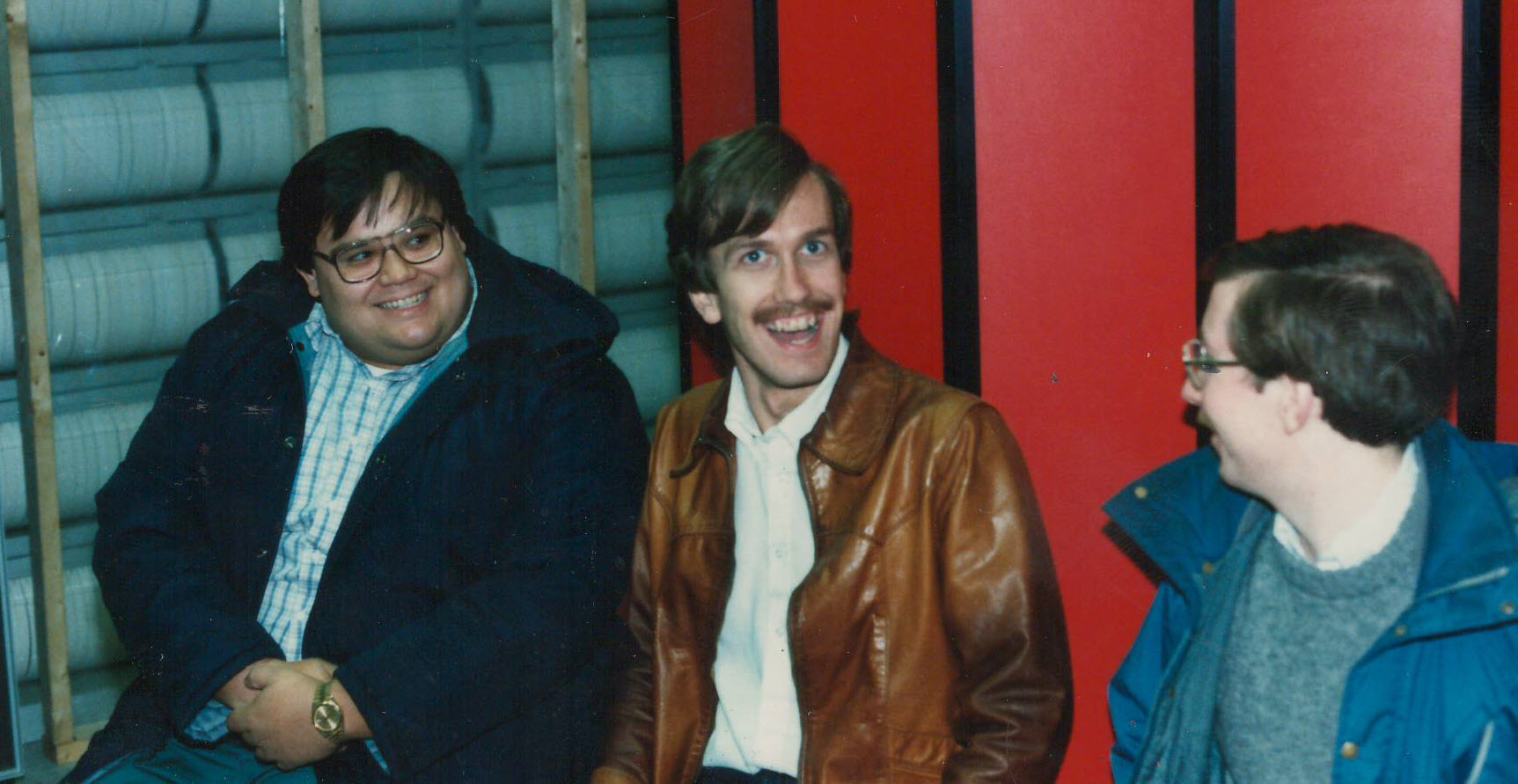
Mike Muuss (center) sitting on the newly installed Cray X-MP/48 at BRL, with Chuck Kennedy (left) and Doug Kingston (right).

== Career ==
A graduate of Johns Hopkins University, Muuss was a senior scientist specializing in geometric solid modeling, ray-tracing, MIMD architectures and digital computer networks at the United States Army Research Laboratory at Aberdeen Proving Ground, Maryland when he died. He wrote a number of software packages (including BRL-CAD) and network tools (including ttcp and the concept of the default route or "default gateway") and contributed to many others (including BIND).

However, the thousand-line ping, which he wrote in December 1983 while working at the Ballistic Research Laboratory, is the program for which he is most remembered. Due to its usefulness, ping has been implemented on a large number of operating systems, initially Berkeley Software Distribution (BSD) and Unix, but later others including Windows and Mac OS X.

In 1993, the USENIX Association gave a Lifetime Achievement Award (Flame) to the Computer Systems Research Group at University of California, Berkeley, honoring 180 individuals, including Muuss, who contributed to the CSRG's 4.4BSD-Lite release.

Muuss is mentioned in two books, The Cuckoo's Egg (ISBN 0-7434-1146-3) and Cyberpunk: Outlaws and Hackers on the Computer Frontier (ISBN 0-684-81862-0), for his role in tracking down crackers. He is also mentioned in Peter Salus's A Quarter Century of UNIX and a link to his website's ping page is included in How Linux Works (ISBN 1718500408).

Muuss died in an automobile collision on Interstate 95 on November 20, 2000. The Michael J. Muuss Research Award, set up by friends and family of Muuss, memorializes him at Johns Hopkins University.

== See also ==
- Heterogeneous Element Processor
