= PLaSM =

Scripting language designed for solid modeling

- Developer: PLaSM Team
- Written in: C++ with Python wrappers
- Operating system: Linux, Windows, Mac
- Type: Solid modeling software
- License: GNU General Public License
- Website: www.dia.uniroma3.it/plasm/

PLaSM (Programming Language of Solid Modeling) is an open source scripting language for solid modeling, a discipline that constitutes the foundation of computer-aided design and CAD systems. In contrast to other CAD programs, PLaSM emphasizes scripting rather than interactive GUI work. Users can create arbitrarily complex designs using a wide range of simple 2D and 3D objects, advanced curves and curved surfaces, Boolean operations, and elementary as well as advanced geometric transformations.

The scripting approach is very different from working with an interactive graphical user interface (GUI). Although it means less user comfort, it offers some advantages as scripts reveal all details of the design procedure (not only the final design) and students are exposed to elementary computer programming.

== History ==
PLaSM has been developed since the 1980s by the CAD group at the Universities Roma Tre and La Sapienza in Rome, Italy, by Alberto Paoluzzi and his collaborators. It was used at the University of Rome to create an extensive database of ancient Roman architecture.

== See also ==
- OpenSCAD is another open source scripting language for creating 3D objects
