= OpenImageIO =

Image processing software library

- Original authors: Larry Gritz and other contributors
- Stable release: 3.1.12.0 / April 1, 2026; 3 months ago
- Written in: C++
- Operating system: Multiplatform
- Platform: Multiplatform
- Type: graphics software
- License: BSD (modified)
- Website: sites.google.com/site/openimageio/
- Repository: github.com/AcademySoftwareFoundation/OpenImageIO

OpenImageIO is an open source library for reading and writing images. Support for different image formats is realised through plugins. The project is distributed with a modified BSD license.

== History ==
Project OpenImageIO started as ImageIO - an API that is part of Gelato, renderer software developed by nVidia. Work on ImageIO started in 2002. In the same year the specification of the API and its header files was released under BSD license. In 2007, when Gelato was discontinued, the development of ImageIO also ceased. After this, Larry Gritz, Gelato's lead developer, started a new project, OpenImageIO.

In April 2009 OpenImageIO was accepted into the Google Summer of Code program with four student slots.

September 2009 marked the release of Cloudy with a Chance of Meatballs, the first full-length feature film in whose production OpenImageIO, alongside Open Shading Language, was used as the texturing engine.

== Applications ==
OpenImageIO library comes with a few applications that demonstrate its features:

- iconvert - converts image files from one format to another
- idiff - compare two images, print information on how much they differ
- iinfo - prints basic (width and height of the image and its color depth) or detailed (metadata) information about the given image
- igrep - searches images for matching metadata
- iv - a simple image viewer
- maketx - a mipmap generation tool

== Supported formats ==
As of January 2018 the library supports the following formats: OpenEXR, HDR/RGBE, TIFF, JPEG/JFIF, PNG, Truevision TGA, BMP, ICO, FITS as well as BMP, JPEG-2000, RMan Zfile, FITS, DDS, Softimage PIC, PNM, DPX, Cineon, IFF, Field3D, Ptex, Photoshop PSD, Wavefront RLA, SGI, WebP, GIF. In addition, video files are supported through FFmpeg and raw camera formats are supported through LibRaw.

== See also ==
- ImageMagick
- DevIL
