= Blue Moon Rendering Tools =

Photorealistic 3D image rendering system

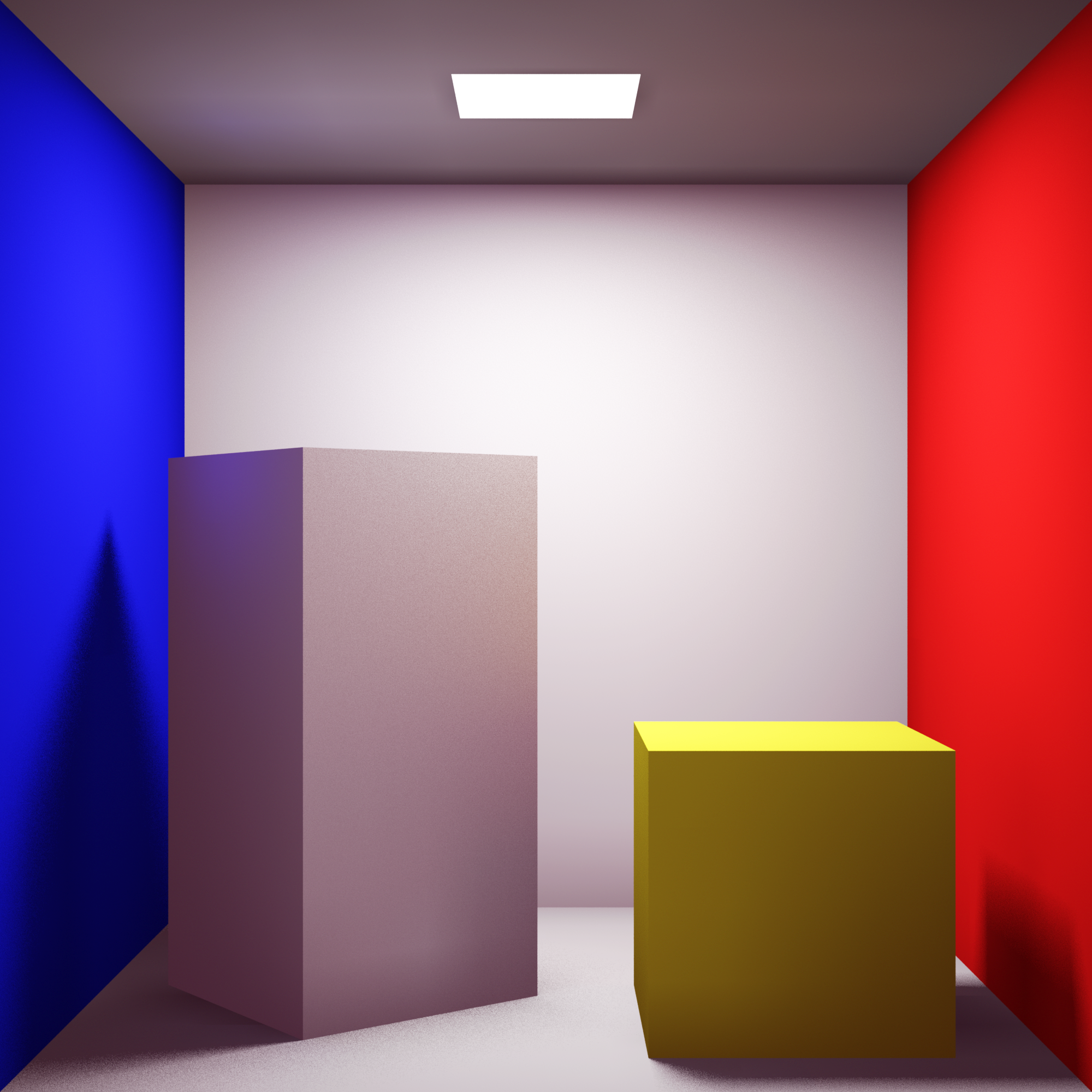
- The Cornell box rendered by BMRT 2.3.5 (1997) with radiosity enabled
- Developer: Larry Gritz/Exluna
- Final release: 2.6 / November 2000
- Operating system: IRIX, Linux, Microsoft Windows
- Successor: Exluna Entropy
- Type: 3D renderer
- License: Proprietary

Blue Moon Rendering Tools, or BMRT, is one of the most famous RenderMan-compliant photorealistic rendering systems and was a precursor to NVIDIA's Gelato renderer. It was distributed as shareware, with free use for students or noncommercial users. BMRT was a popular renderer with students and other people who were trying to learn the RenderMan interface. It also had some features PhotoRealistic RenderMan did not have at the time, for example, ray tracing, radiosity, volume rendering, and area lights. Even Pixar used BMRT for ray tracing before PRMan had such features. It was used for 3D rendering in movies such as A Bug's Life, Stuart Little, The Cell, Hollow Man, and Woman on Top.

BMRT was originally developed by Larry Gritz while he was at Cornell University. He developed it during the early 1990s, first published it in 1994, and was subsequently hired by Pixar to work on their PhotoRealistic RenderMan product.

The last version of the renderer under the BMRT name was 2.6, released in November 2000. The first version of Entropy, BMRT's successor, was 3.0, released in July 2001.

In 2000, Gritz left Pixar to form a company called Exluna, whose flagship product was Entropy, a RenderMan renderer based on BMRT with additional features and optimizations. NVIDIA acquired Exluna in July 2002. Around the acquisition, Pixar filed a patent infringement lawsuit concerning Entropy, which Exluna said had no merit; by July 2002, Pixar and Exluna had settled a dispute involving trade secret, copyright, and patent allegations. In September 2002, Computer Graphics World reported that neither Entropy nor BMRT was being offered by NVIDIA. Gritz and other Exluna employees stayed at NVIDIA to develop the Gelato renderer.

== Gallery ==
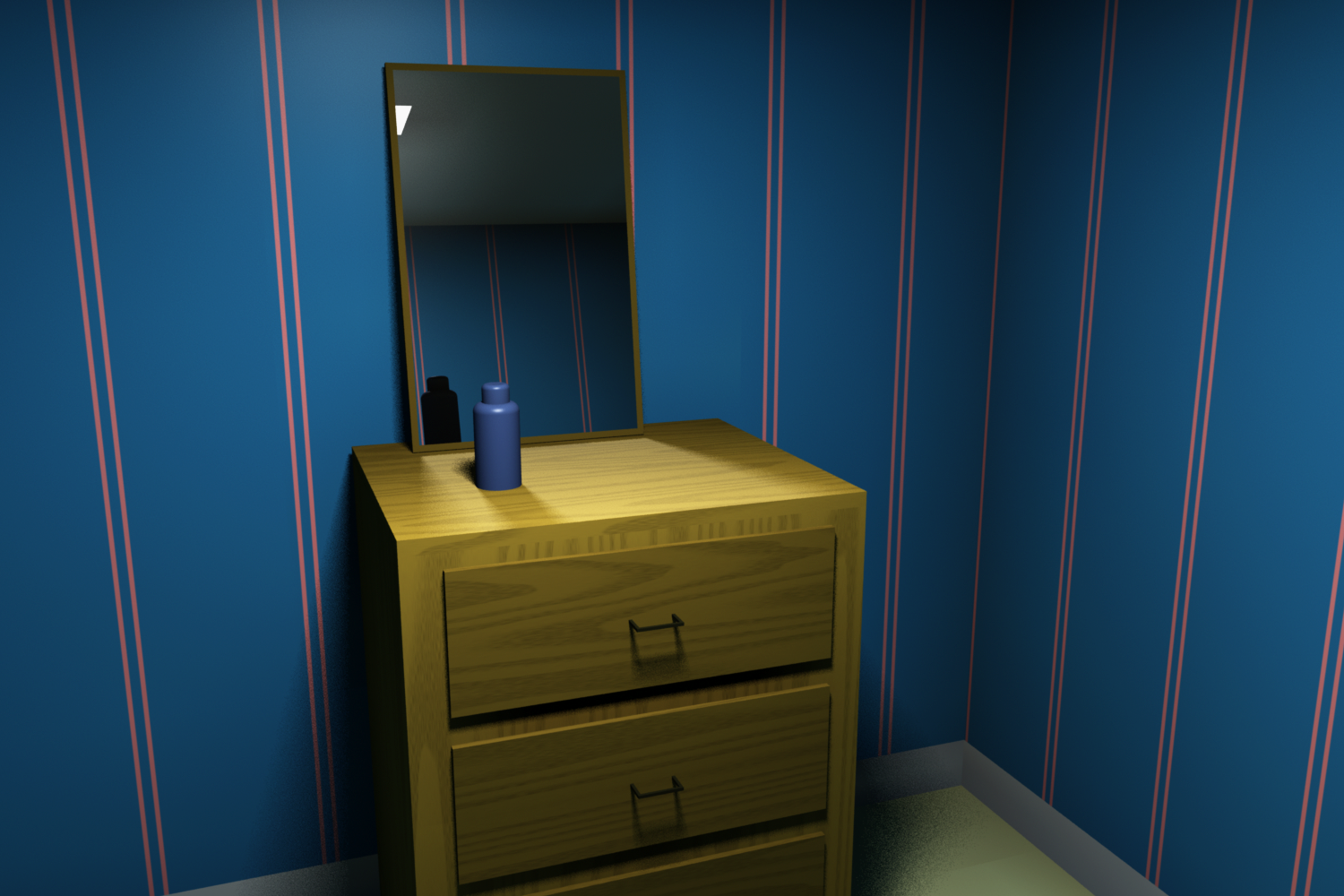
A dresser with light bouncing off the mirror demonstrating radiosity and ray tracing

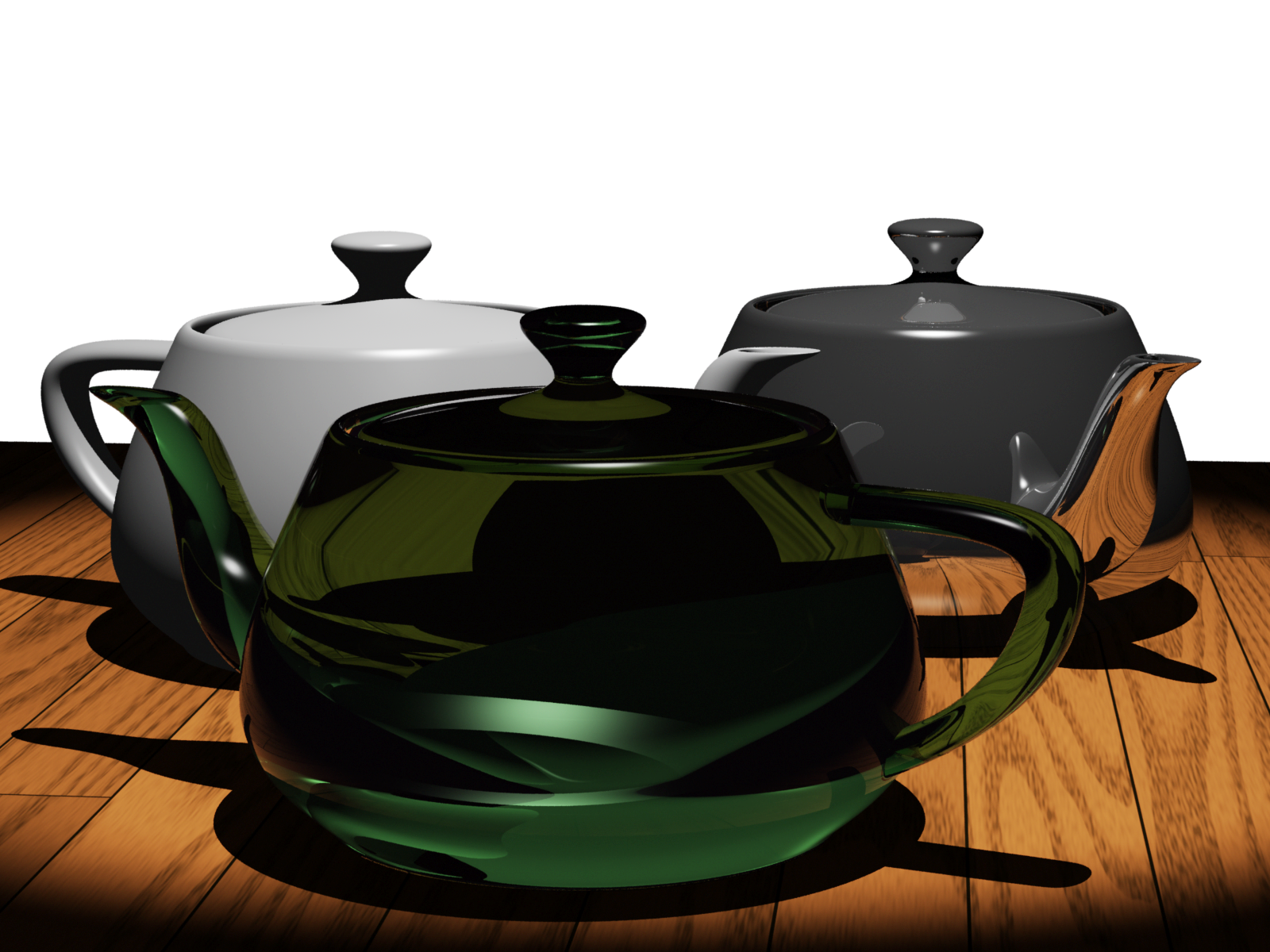
Utah teapots with ray-traced reflection and refraction

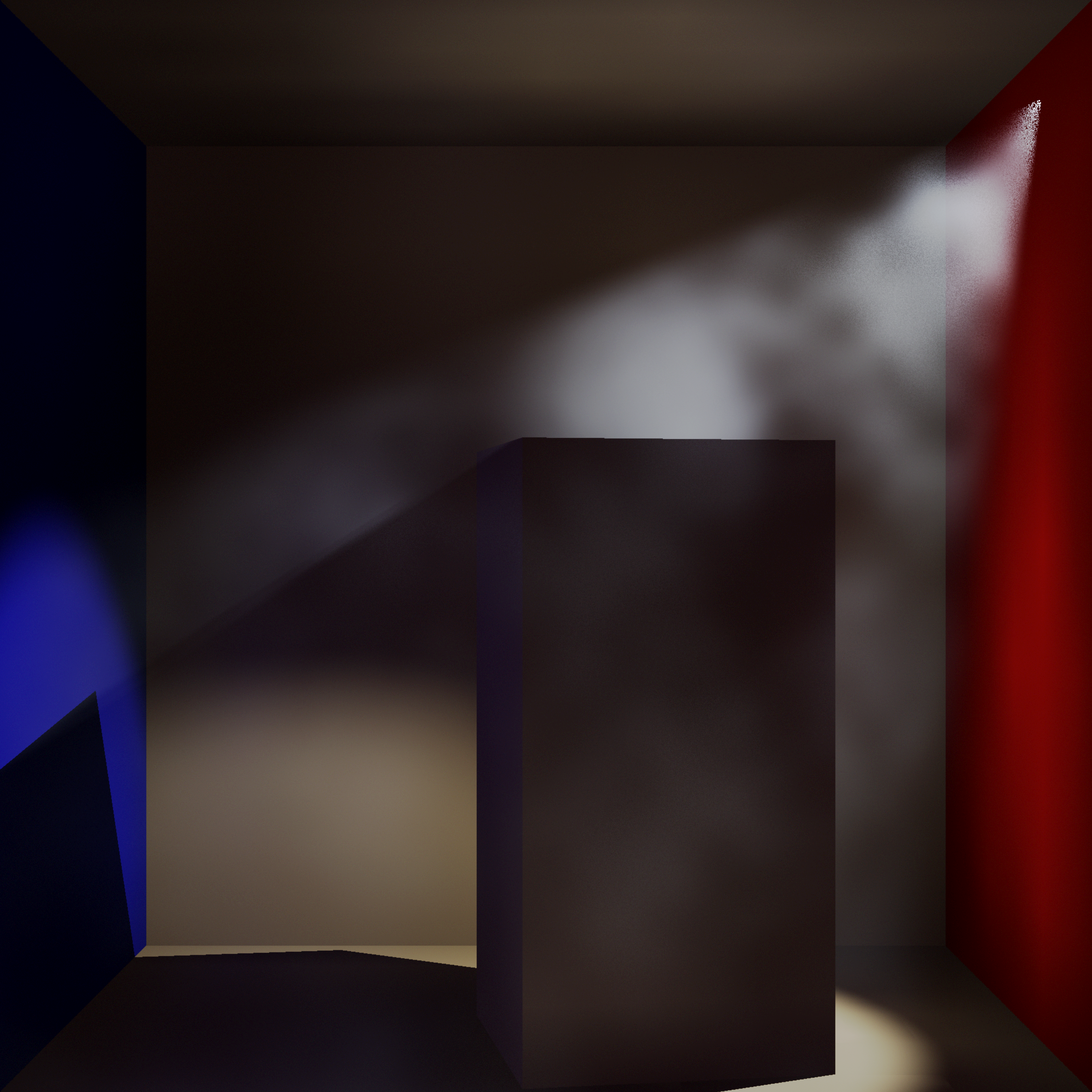
Volume rendering

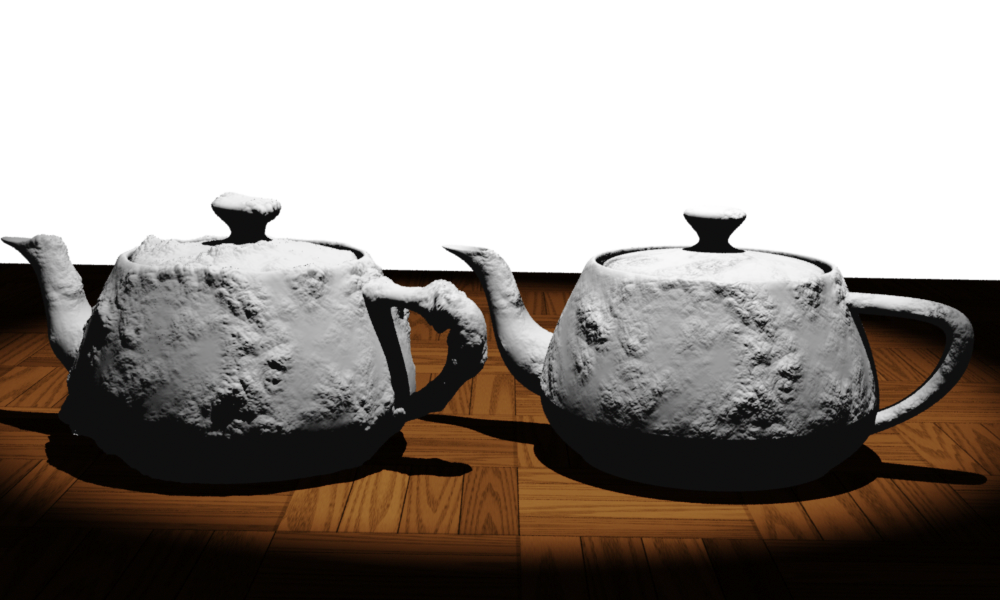
Displacement mapping

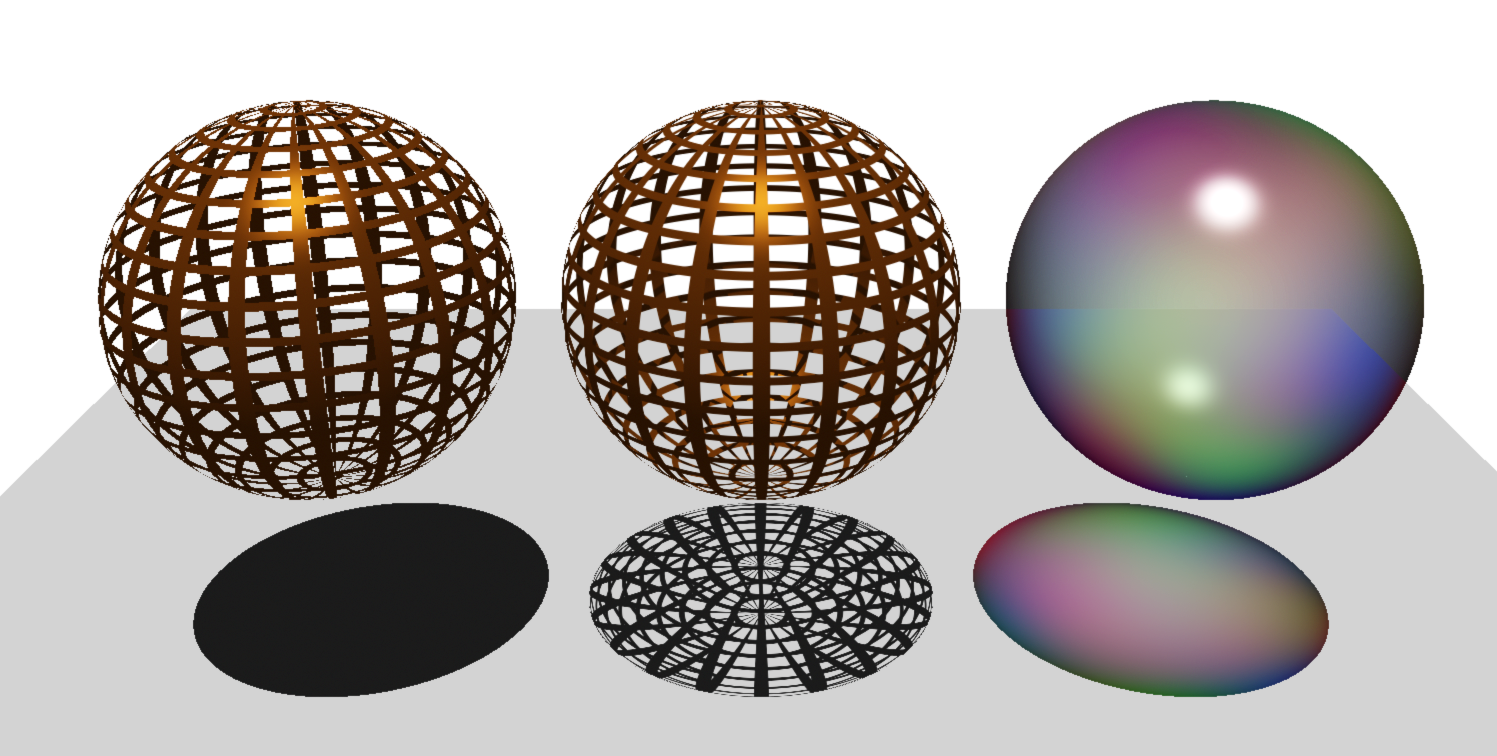
Anti-aliasing and shadow demo

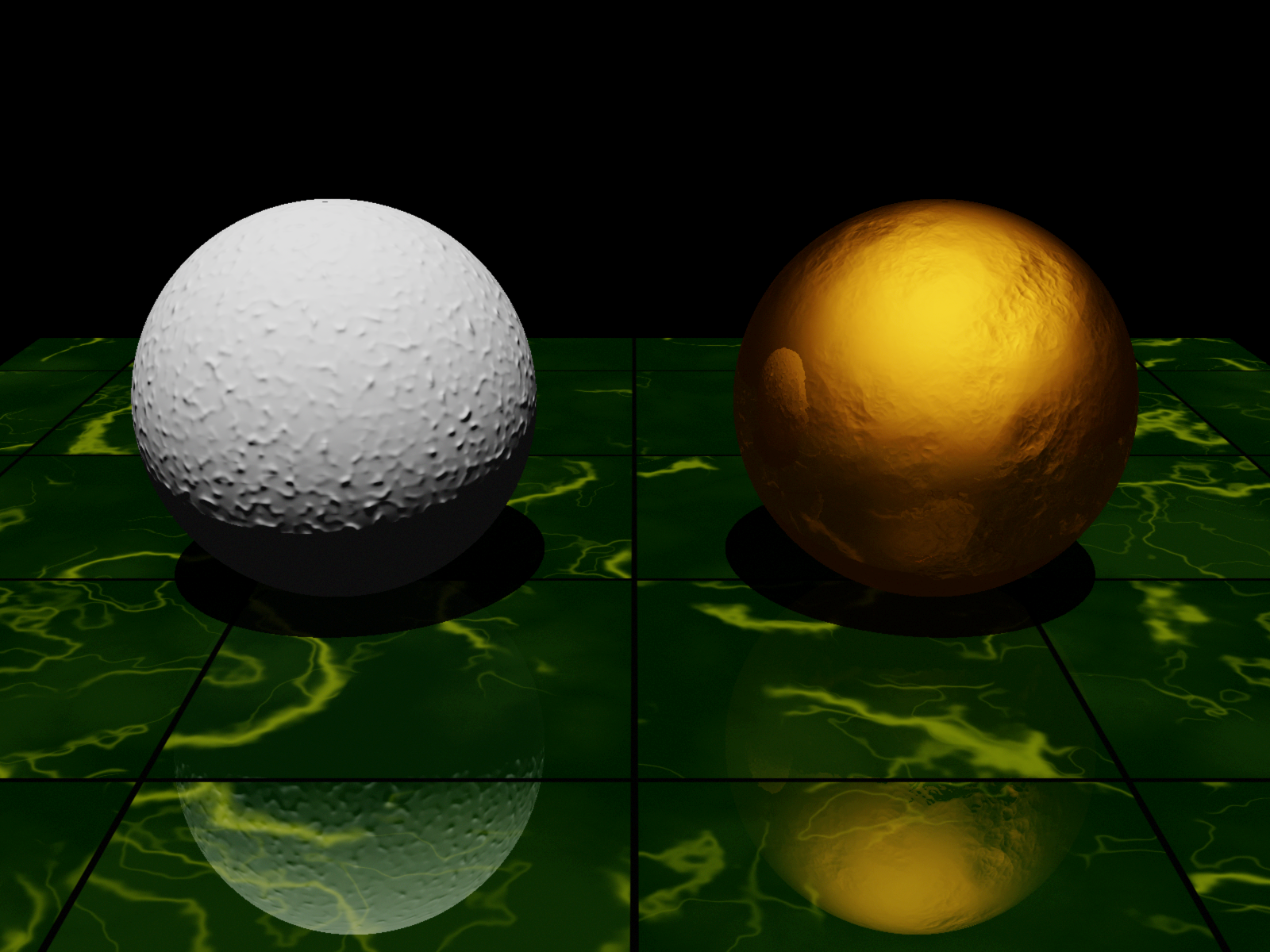
Bump mapping and reflections without using reflection maps
