= Pixar RenderMan =

3D rendering software used by Pixar

- Official RenderMan logo
- Developer: Pixar
- Release: 1987; 39 years ago
- Stable release: 27.0 / November 13, 2025; 12 months ago
- Operating system: Linux, macOS, Windows
- Type: Rendering system
- License: Proprietary commercial software
- Website: renderman.pixar.com

Pixar RenderMan is a photorealistic 3D rendering software produced by Pixar Animation Studios. Pixar uses RenderMan to render their in-house CGI animated movie productions and it is also available as a commercial product licensed to third parties. In 2015, a free non-commercial version of RenderMan became available.

== Name ==
To speed up rendering, Pixar engineers performed experiments with parallel rendering computers using Transputer chips inside a Pixar Image Computer. The name comes from the nickname of a small circuit board (2.5 × 5 inches or 6.4 × 13 cm) containing one Transputer that engineer Jeff Mock could put in his pocket. During that time the Sony Walkman was very popular and Jeff Mock called his portable board Renderman, leading to the software name.

== Technology ==
RenderMan used the RenderMan Interface Specification (RISpec) to define cameras, geometry, materials, and lights. This specification facilitated communication between 3D modeling and animation applications and the render engine that generates the final high-quality (HQ) images. In the past, RenderMan used the Reyes Rendering Architecture. The RenderMan Interface Specification was first presented at SIGGRAPH in 1988. According to Ed Catmull, Pixar developed the interface with a group of about 19 companies, with Pat Hanrahan as the architect. Pixar's commercial implementation of the specification, PhotoRealistic RenderMan (PRMan), was released the following year in 1989. Catmull stated that in 1993, no software product met the RenderMan Standard, and that RenderMan itself met it about two years later.

Additionally RenderMan 21 added support for Open Shading Language to define textural patterns.

When Pixar started development, Steve Jobs described the original goal for RenderMan in 1991:

"Our goal is to make Renderman and Iceman the system software of the 90s," Mr. Jobs said, likening these programs to PostScript, the software developed by Adobe Systems Inc. for high-quality typography.

— Lawrence M. Fisher,

During this time, Pixar used the C language for developing Renderman, which allowed them to port it to many platforms.

Historically, RenderMan used the Reyes algorithm to render images with added support for advanced effects such as ray tracing and global illumination. Support for Reyes rendering and the RenderMan Shading Language were removed from RenderMan in 2016.

RenderMan 19 had the new RenderMan Integrator System (RIS) and could use Monte Carlo path tracing to generate images. With RenderMan 27, XPU (extreme processing unit) is the main renderer, set to replace RIS (now in maintenance mode).

== Awards ==
RenderMan has been used to create digital visual effects for Hollywood blockbuster movies such as Beauty and the Beast, Aladdin, The Lion King, Terminator 2: Judgment Day, Toy Story, Jurassic Park, Avatar, Titanic, the Star Wars prequels, and The Lord of the Rings. RenderMan has received four Academy Scientific and Technical Awards. The first was in 1993 honoring Pat Hanrahan, Anthony A. Apodaca, Loren Carpenter, Rob L. Cook, Ed Catmull, Darwyn Peachey, and Tom Porter. The second was as part of the 73rd Scientific and Technical Academy Awards ceremony presentation on March 3, 2001: the Academy of Motion Picture Arts and Sciences' Board of Governors honored Ed Catmull, Loren Carpenter and Rob Cook with an Academy Award of Merit "for significant advancements to the field of motion picture rendering as exemplified in Pixar’s RenderMan". The third was in 2010 honoring "Per Christensen, Christophe Hery, and Michael Bunnell for the development of point-based rendering for indirect illumination and ambient occlusion." The fourth was in 2011 honoring David Laur. It has also won the Gordon E. Sawyer Award in 2009 and The Coons Award. It is the first software product awarded an Academy Award.

== Filmography ==
=== Feature films ===
- Jurassic Park (1993)
- Toy Story (1995)
- A Bug's Life (1998)
- Toy Story 2 (1999)
- Chicken Run (2000)
- Monsters, Inc. (2001)
- Finding Nemo (2003)
- The Incredibles (2004)
- Valiant (2005)
- Chicken Little (2005)
- Cars (2006)
- The Ant Bully (2006)
- Ratatouille (2007)
- Tinker Bell (2008)
- WALL-E (2008)
- Up (2009)
- Astro Boy (2009)
- Tinker Bell and the Lost Treasure (2009)
- Toy Story 3 (2010)
- Tinker Bell and the Great Fairy Rescue (2010)
- Tangled (2010)
- Cars 2 (2011)
- Brave (2012)
- Monsters University (2013)
- Planes (2013)
- Frozen (2013)
- Planes: Fire & Rescue (2014)
- Inside Out (2015)
- The Good Dinosaur (2015)
- Finding Dory (2016)
- Cars 3 (2017)
- Coco (2017)
- Incredibles 2 (2018)
- Toy Story 4 (2019)
- Onward (2020)
- Soul (2020)
- Luca (2021)
- Turning Red (2022)
- Lightyear (2022)
- Elemental (2023)
- The Garfield Movie (2024)
- Inside Out 2 (2024)
- Elio (2025)
- Hoppers (2026)
- Toy Story 5 (2026)

== Notable studios using RenderMan ==
=== North America ===
==== United States ====
- Pixar
- Industrial Light & Magic
- Walt Disney Animation Studios
- Laika
- Tippett Studio

==== Canada ====
- Bardel Entertainment
- Bron Studios
- Mr. X
- Spin VFX

=== South America ===
==== Brazil ====
- StartAnima

=== Europe ===
==== United Kingdom ====
- DNEG
- Locksmith Animation
- Moving Picture Company

==== France ====
- Mac Guff
- TeamTO
- Zag Inc.

==== Germany ====
- Rise FX
- Trixter

=== Asia ===
==== China ====
- Base FX
- Light Chaser Animation Studios

==== South Korea ====
- Dexter Studios

== Gallery ==
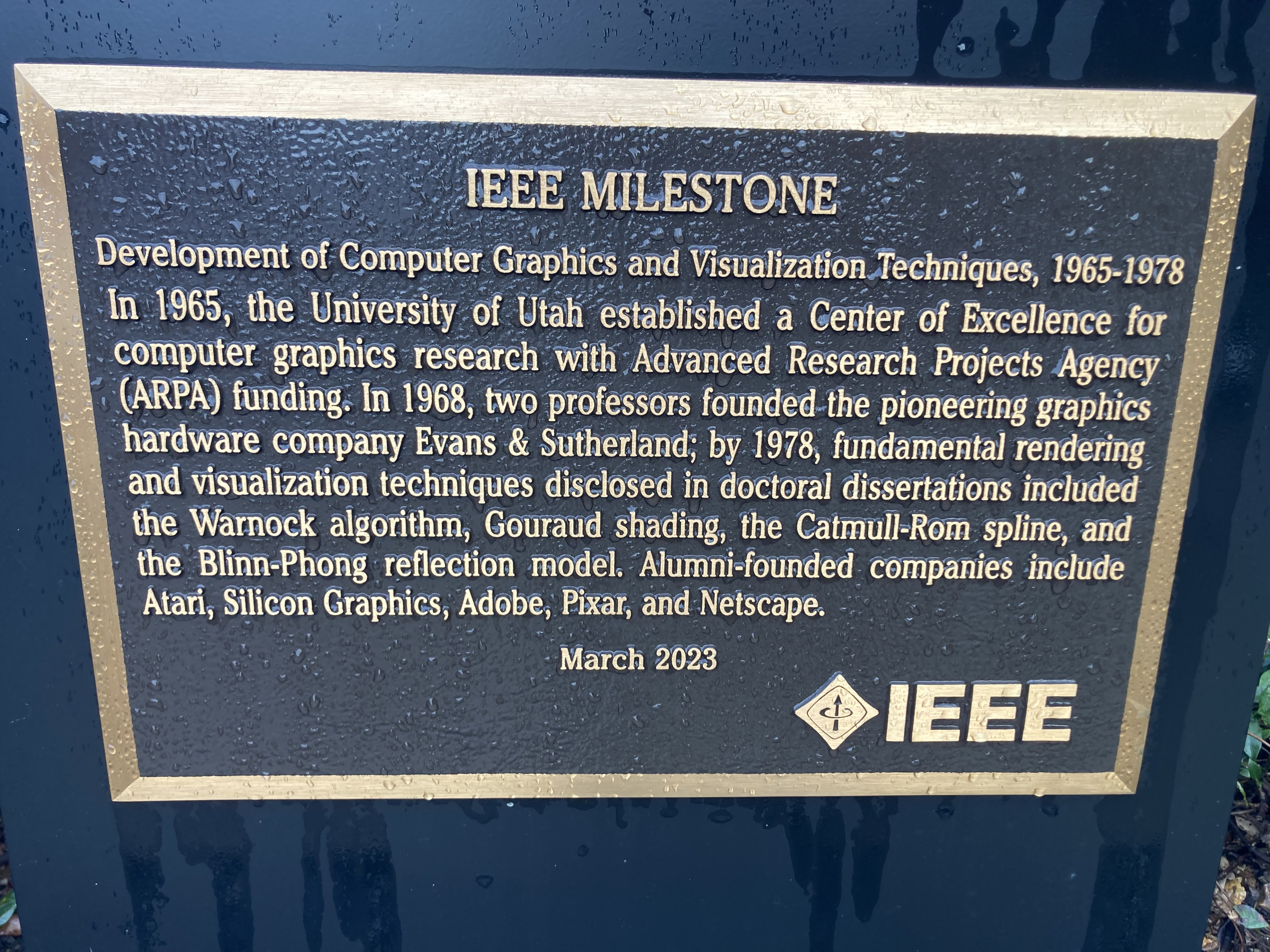
Development of Computer graphics and Visualization Techniques Plaque outside of Pixar headquarters.

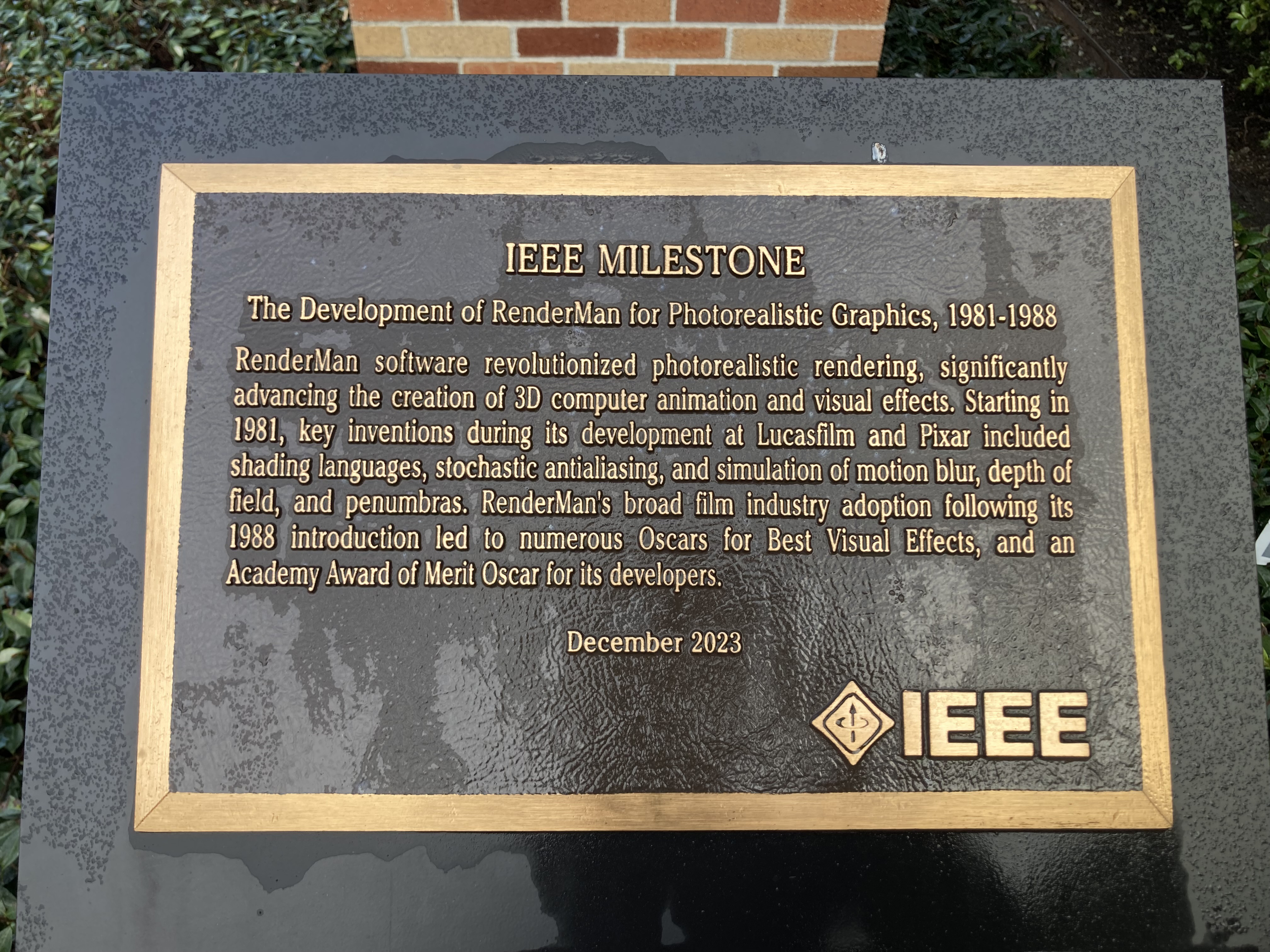
Development of Renderman plaque outside of Pixar Headquarters.

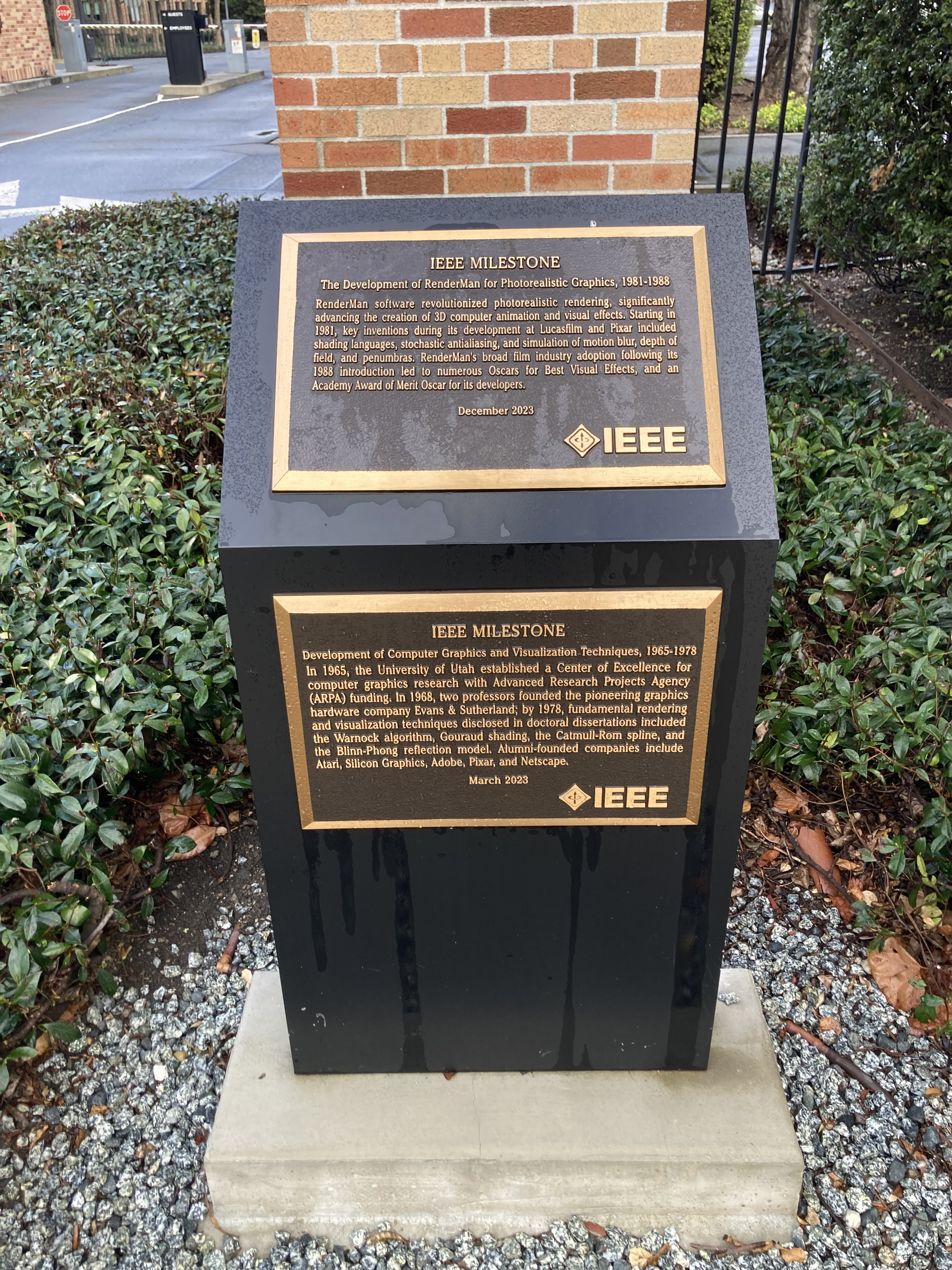
The plaques by IEEE.

== See also ==
- List of 3D rendering software
- Universal Scene Description
