= Fan =

Fan commonly refers to:

- Fan (machine), for producing airflow, often used for cooling
- Hand fan, an implement held and waved by hand to move air for cooling
- Fan (person), short for fanatic; an enthusiast or supporter, especially with regard to entertainment

Fan, FAN or fans may also refer to:

== Arts, entertainment, and media ==
=== Music ===
- "Fan" (Pascal Obispo song), 2003
- "Fan" (Offset song), 2023
- Fans (album), 1984, by Malcolm McLaren
- "Fans" (song), a 2007 album track on Because of the Times by the Kings of Leon

=== Other uses in arts, entertainment, and media ===
- The Fan (1996 film), an American psychological thriller film by Tony Scott, starring Robert DeNiro and Wesley Snipes
- Fan (2007 film), a Uruguayan drama film
- Fan (2016 film), an Indian Hindi film
- Fan, a character in the video game Yie Ar Kung-Fu
- Fan, a character in the novella A Christmas Carol

== Biology ==
- Free amino nitrogen, in brewing and winemaking, amino acids available for yeast metabolism
- Sea fan, a marine animal of the cnidarian phylum

== Computing and mathematics ==
- Fan (geometry), the set of all planes through a given line
- Fan (order), a class of preorderings on a field
- FAN algorithm, an algorithm for automatic test pattern generation
- Fan triangulation, a fast method to decompose a convex polygon in triangles
- .fan filename extension for the Fantom (programming language)
- File area network, a method for file sharing over a network
- Triangle fan, a data structure to describe polygons in computer graphics
- Fan, a type of polyhedral complex

== Geology ==
One of several types of fan-shaped deposits of sediment caused by the flow of streams or glacial melt:

- Abyssal fan, underwater geological structures linked with large-scale sediment deposition
- Alluvial fan
- Outwash plain

== People ==
- Fan (surname) (Chinese character: 范, pinyin: Fàn), a common Chinese surname
  - Fan Clan, a prominent clan with the above surname during the Spring and Autumn period of China
- Fán (surname) (Chinese character: 樊, pinyin: Fán), a common Chinese surname
- Fan, the legendary descendant of the Yellow Emperor claimed as the progenitor of the Su clan in China

== Places ==
- Fan (river), in Albania
- Fan, Albania, municipality in Albania
- Fan County, in Henan, China
- Fan district, historic district in Richmond, Virginia
- Fanling station, Hong Kong; MTR station code FAN

== Technology ==
- Future Air Navigation System, or FAN, an air traffic control scheme
- Turbofan, a type of jet engine
- Winnowing fan, device for winnowing grain

== Weapons ==
- Japanese war fan, an object used in Japanese feudal warfare, also used in martial arts
- Korean fighting fan, an object used in Korean martial arts

== Other uses ==
- Armed Forces of the North, a Chadian rebel army (French: Forces Armées du Nord)
- Fan (cards), to spread playing cards fanwise
- Fan (Daoism), 反 philosophical concept of "return; reverse; repeat"
- Fang language, ISO 639-2 code
- Nicaraguan Air Force (Spanish: Fuerza Aérea Nicaragüense)

== See also ==
- The Fan (disambiguation)
- Fandom (disambiguation)
- Fanfan (disambiguation)
- Fanning (disambiguation)
