= GPUOpen =

Middleware software suite

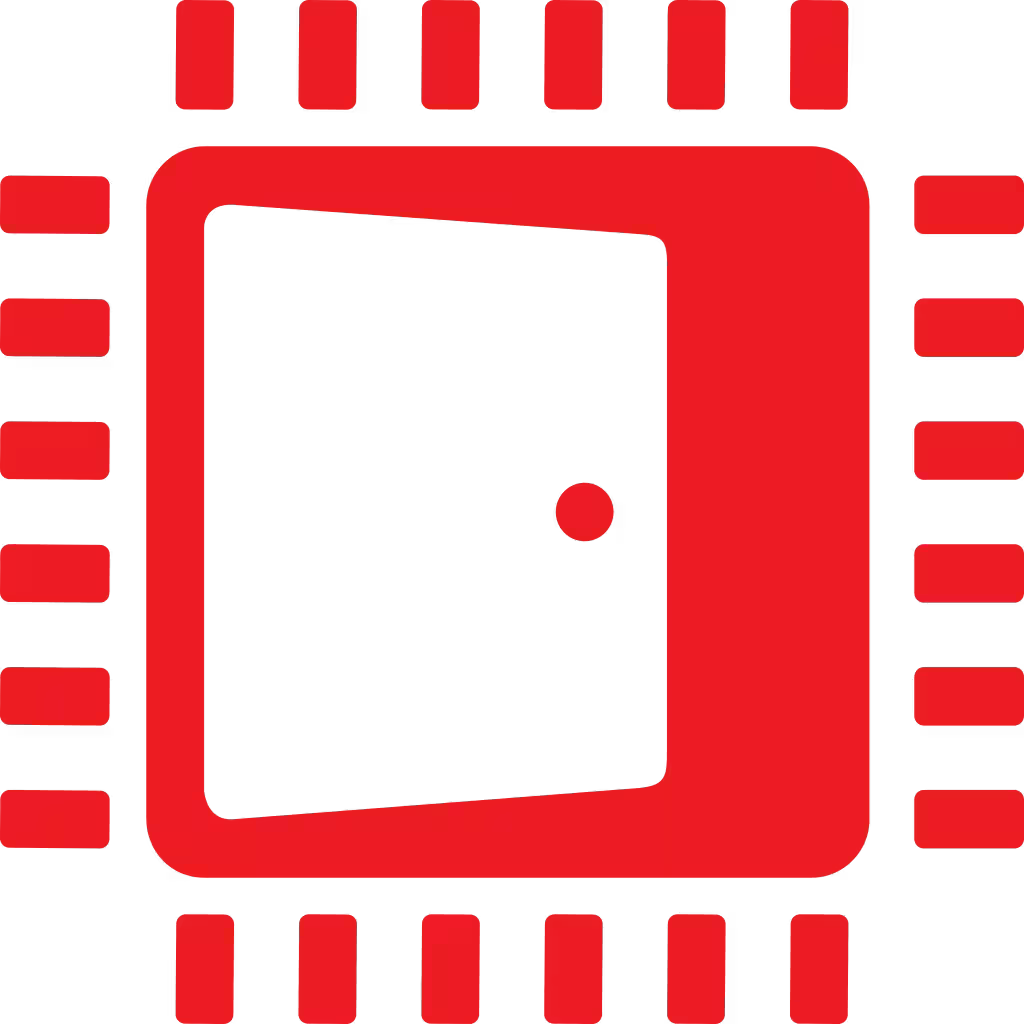
- Logo
- Original author: Advanced Micro Devices
- Developer: Advanced Micro Devices
- Release: January 26, 2016
- Written in: C, C++, GLSL
- Operating system: Linux, Microsoft Windows
- Type: Game effects libraries, GPU debugging, CPU & GPU profiling
- License: MIT License
- Website: gpuopen.com
- Repository: github.com/GPUOpen-LibrariesAndSDKs

GPUOpen is a middleware software suite originally developed by AMD's Radeon Technologies Group that offers advanced visual effects for computer games. It was released in 2016. GPUOpen serves as an alternative to, and a direct competitor of Nvidia GameWorks. GPUOpen is similar to GameWorks in that it encompasses several different graphics technologies as its main components that were previously independent and separate from one another. However, GPUOpen is partially open source software, unlike GameWorks which is proprietary and closed.

== History ==
GPUOpen was announced on December 15, 2015, and released on January 26, 2016.

== Rationale ==
Nicolas Thibieroz, AMD's Senior Manager of Worldwide Gaming Engineering, argues that "it can be difficult for developers to leverage their R&D investment on both consoles and PC because of the disparity between the two platforms" and that "proprietary libraries or tools chains with 'black box' APIs prevent developers from accessing the code for maintenance, porting or optimizations purposes". He says that upcoming architectures, such as AMD's RX 400 series "include many features not exposed today in PC graphics APIs".

AMD designed GPUOpen to be a competing open-source middleware stack released under the MIT License. The libraries are intended to increase software portability between video game consoles, PCs and also high-performance computing.

== Components ==
GPUOpen unifies many of AMD's previously separate tools and solutions into one package, also fully open-sourcing them under the MIT License. GPUOpen also makes it easy for developers to get low-level GPU access.

Additionally AMD wants to grant interested developers the kind of low-level "direct access" to their GCN-based GPUs, that surpasses the possibilities of Direct3D 12 or Vulkan. AMD mentioned e.g. a low-level access to the Asynchronous Compute Engines (ACEs). The ACE implement "Asynchronous Compute", but they cannot be freely configured under either Vulkan or Direct3D 12.

GPUOpen is made up of several main components, tools, and SDKs.

=== Games and CGI ===
Software for computer-generated imagery (CGI) used in development of computer games and movies alike.

==== Visual effects libraries ====
GPUOpen Visual Effects Libraries
Name	API	Source	Description
TressFX	DirectX 12, Vulkan	GitHub	This visual effects library allows the creation of realistic hair, fur, and grass.
GeometryFX	DirectX 11	GitHub	This library allows easy access to compute-based triangle filtering.
DepthOfFieldFX	DirectX 11	GitHub	This library grants access to a depth of field implementation optimized for the GCN GPU architecture via a compute shader.
ShadowFX	DirectX 11, DirectX 12	GitHub	This library grants access to an implementation for deferred shadow filtering that is optimized for the GCN GPU architecture.
FidelityFX	DirectX 11, DirectX 12, Vulkan	GitHub	FidelityFX is a suite of visual effects and effects-helper libraries.

==== FidelityFX ====
FidelityFX Components
Name	Algorithm	Source	Description	Official support
FidelityFX CAS	Contrast Adaptive Sharpening	GitHub	This algorithm adaptively sharpens an image or scene while minimizing artifacts.	DirectX 11+, DirectX 12, Vulkan
FidelityFX CACAO	Combined Adaptive Compute Ambient Occlusion	GitHub	This algorithm is an optimized implementation of adaptive sampling ambient occlusion.	DirectX 11+, DirectX 12, Vulkan
FidelityFX LPM	Luminance Preserving Mapper	GitHub	This algorithm is used to tone map the luma of an RGB pixel rather than tone mapping the color of the pixel.	DirectX 11+, DirectX 12, Vulkan
FidelityFX SPD	Single Pass Downsampler	GitHub	This algorithm, optimized for the RDNA GPU architecture, is used to generate 12 MIP levels for a given texture.	DirectX 11+, DirectX 12, Vulkan
FidelityFX SSSR	Stochastic Screen Space Reflections	GitHub	This algorithm is used to add screen space reflections to a frame or scene.	DirectX 11+, DirectX 12, Vulkan
FidelityFX VS	Variable Shading	GitHub	This algorithm is used to generate image-based variable rate shading using the luminance of samples in the prior frame.	DirectX 11+, DirectX 12, Vulkan
FidelityFX Parallel Sort	Radix Sort	GitHub	This algorithm provides a compute-based radix sort.	DirectX 11+, DirectX 12, Vulkan
FidelityFX Denoiser	Shadow & Reflection Denoiser	GitHub	This algorithm provides denoising functionality for ray-traced shadows and ray-traced or screen-space reflections.	DirectX 11+, DirectX 12, Vulkan
FidelityFX Super Resolution 1	Spatial Upsampler	GitHub	This algorithm is used to upsample an image or frame into a higher resolution using only the spatial information provided in the input frame.	DirectX 11+, DirectX 12, Vulkan
FidelityFX Super Resolution 2	Temporal Upscaler	GitHub	This algorithm is used to upscale frame(s) into a higher resolution using the temporal information provided by input frames.	DirectX 12, Vulkan
FSR 3 Frame Generation	Analytical temporal frame interpolator	GitHub	This algorithm increases the perceived frame rate of a game by calculating an intermediate frame based of two already rendered frames.	AMD RDNA 2+, NVIDIA RTX 20+, Intel Arc
FSR™ “Redstone”
FSR™ Upscaling	Neural network-based image upscaler	GitHub	This algorithm uses machine learning–based models to upscale rendered frames to a higher resolution.	AMD RDNA 2-4
FSR™ Frame Generation	Neural network-based frame interpolator	GitHub	This algorithm uses machine learning-based models to generate an intermediate frame based off two already rendered frames.	AMD RDNA 4
FSR™ Ray Regeneration	Neural network-based real-time denoiser	GitHub	This algorithm uses machine learning-based models to denoise ray traced surfaces.	AMD RDNA 4
FSR™ Radiance Caching (Technical Preview)	Neural network-based radiance caching	GitHub	This algorithm uses machine learning-based models to approximate indirect radiance in path-traced scenes, reducing the number of required ray calculations.	AMD RDNA 4

==== FidelityFX Super Resolution ====
FidelityFX Super Resolution (FSR) is a real time rendering technology suite. There are multiple versions of FSR with distinctive techniques:

- FSR 1 is a spatial upscaler based on or similar to the Lanczos algorithm, requiring an anti-aliased lower resolution image. It also performs edge reconstruction and gradient reversal. This is then followed by a contrast adaptive sharpening pass (RCAS) to reintroduce detail into the final image. AMD states:
  FSR is composed of two main passes:
  - An upscaling pass called EASU (Edge-Adaptive Spatial Upsampling) that also performs edge reconstruction. In this pass the input frame is analyzed and the main part of the algorithm detects gradient reversals – essentially looking at how neighboring gradients differ – from a set of input pixels. The intensity of the gradient reversals defines the weights to apply to the reconstructed pixels at display resolution.
  - A sharpening pass called RCAS (Robust Contrast-Adaptive Sharpening) that extracts pixel detail in the upscaled image.
- FSR 2 is a temporal upscaler based on a modified Lanczos requiring an aliased lower resolution image and utilising the temporal data (such as motion vectors and frame history) and then applies its own antialiasing pass which replaces the game's built in antialiasing solution.
- FSR 3 adds frame generation and "native antialiasing". Frame generation increases the perceived frame rate of a game. "Native antialiasing", similar to Nvidia's DLAA, can be used without upscaling for improved antialiasing; it can also be combined with frame generation and Anti-Lag+.
- FSR “Redstone” (formerly marketed as FSR 4) is a rendering suite that uses machine learning–based models for upscaling, frame generation, ray regeneration, and radiance caching.

Release history
Release (Note: FSR versions stated in italic present hotfixes or minor updates.)	Release date	Highlights
1.0 / 1.0.1	Jun 2021	FidelityFX Super Resolution (FSR) launch, source code available July 2021.
1.0.2	Nov 2021	Robust Contrast-Adaptive Sharpening (RCAS) oversharpening hotfix.
1.1	Jul 2023	Available as part of FidelityFX SDK.
2.0.1 / 2.0.1a	Mar 2022	FidelityFX Super Resolution 2.0 (FSR 2) launch, source code available June 2022.
2.1.0	Sep 2022	Reduced ghosting and improved upscaling quality. Farming Simulator 2022 was one of early adopters with patch 1.7.1.
2.1.1	Sep 2022	
2.1.2	Oct 2022	
2.2.0 / 2.2.0a	Nov 2022	HDR range improvements, ghosting and flickering artefacts reduction. Source code available February 2023.
2.2.1	Jun 2023	
2.2.2	Jul 2023	Available as part of FidelityFX SDK.
3.0 / 3.0.3	Sep 2023	FSR 3 adds frame generation combined with FSR 2 and Anti-Lag+ and supports GPUs from AMD, Nvidia, and Intel. FSR 3 is also compatible with the ninth generation of video game consoles. Source code available December 2023 as part of FidelityFX SDK.
3.0.4	Mar 2024	
3.1.0	Jun 2024	Reduced ghosting, flickering and shimmering and improved temporal stability. Decoupled frame generation from upscaling. Made source file easily upgradable for developers. Vulkan and Xbox Game Development Kit (GDK) support. Source code available July 2024 as part of FidelityFX SDK 1.1.
FSR “Redstone”
FSR Upscaling (4.0.2)	Aug 2025	Introduced a machine learning-based algorithm to increase the resolution of an image based off an input image.
FSR Upscaling (4.0.3)	Dec 2025	Fixing a rendering error when surface dimensions are not multiples of 8.
FSR Frame Generation (4.0.0)	Dec 2025	Introduced a machine learning-based frame interpolation algorithm.
FSR Ray Regeneration (1.0.0)	Dec 2025	Introduced a machine learning-based real-time denoiser for ray-traced workloads.
FSR Radiance Caching (0.9.0) (Preview)	Dec 2025	Machine learning–based radiance caching technique that approximates indirect lighting in path-traced scenes to reduce ray sampling requirements (preview).

The standard presets for FSR by AMD can be found in the table below. Note that these presets are not the only way in which the algorithm can be used, they are simply presets for input/output resolutions. Certain titles, such as Dota 2, offer resolution sliders to fine tune the scaling percentage or dynamically scaling the internal render resolution depending on the FPS cap. AMD has also created a command-line interface tool which allows the user to upscale any image using FSR1/EASU as in addition to other upsampling methods such as bilinear interpolation. It also allows the user to run various stages of the FSR pipeline, such as RCAS, independently.

Standard FSR presets
Quality preset (Note: The algorithm does not necessarily need to be implemented using these presets; it is possible for the implementer to define custom input and output resolutions.)	Scale factor (Note: The linear scale factor used for upsampling the input resolution to the output resolution. For example, a scene rendered at 540p with a 2.00x scale factor would have an output resolution of 1080p.)	Render scale (Note: The linear render scale, compared to the output resolution, that the technology uses to render scenes internally before upsampling. For example, a 1080p scene with a 50% render scale would have an internal resolution of 540p.)
Native AA (since v3.0)	1.00×	100%
Ultra Quality (v1.0 only)	1.30×	77.0%
Quality	1.50×	66.6%
Balanced	1.70×	58.8%
Performance	2.00×	50.0%
Ultra Performance (since v2.0)	3.00×	33.3%

FSR 2 can also be modded into nearly any game supporting DLSS by swapping the DLSS DLL with a translation layer DLL that maps the DLSS API calls to FSR 2 API calls.

==== Frame Generation ====
FSR 3 adds frame generation, a technique that creates new frames in between existing ones by using motion interpolation. Launching in September 2023, FSR 3 uses a combination of FSR 2 and optical flow analysis, which runs using asynchronous compute (as opposed to Nvidia's DLSS 3 which uses dedicated hardware). Because FSR 3 uses a software-based solution, it is compatible with GPUs from AMD, Nvidia, and Intel as well as the ninth generation of video game consoles. To combat additional latency inherent to the frame generation process, AMD has a driver-level feature called Anti-Lag, which only runs on AMD GPUs.

FSR “Redstone” adds a machine learning-based approach to generate frames.

AMD Fluid Motion Frames (AFMF) is a driver-level frame generation technology launching in Q1 2024 which is compatible with all DirectX 11 and DirectX 12 games, however it runs on RDNA 2 and RDNA 3 GPUs. AFMF uses optical flow analysis but not motion vectors, so it can only interpolate a new frame between two traditionally rendered frames. AFMF currently is not compatible with VSYNC.

==== Tools ====
The official AMD directory lists:

Name	Source code	API	OS	Task
CodeXL	CodeXL	Direct3D, OpenGL, OpenCL, Vulkan	Linux; Windows	software development tool suite that includes a GPU debugger, a GPU profiler, a CPU profiler, a static OpenCL kernel analyzer and various plugins.
static analyzer for AMD CodeXL	amd-codexl-analyzer	Direct3D, OpenGL, OpenCL	Linux; Windows 64bit	Off-line compiler and performance analysis CLI-tool for processing: OpenCL kernels, HLSL shaders and GLSL shaders part of the AMD CodeXL tools suite Requires either Radeon Software Crimson Edition or AMD Catalyst to be installed to run this tool.
D3D 12 plug-in for GPU PerfStudio	amd-gpuperfstudio-dx12	Direct3D 12	Windows	a plug-in to GPU PerfStudio GPU perfstudio
Tootle	amd-tootle	agnostic	Linux; Windows	Triangle Order Optimization Tool; originally developed in 2006; can be easily integrated as part of a rendering or mesh pre-processing tool chain Cf. http://mgarland.org/files/papers/quadrics.pdf

Having been released by ATI Technologies under the BSD license in 2006 HLSL2GLSL is not part of GPUOpen. Whether similar tools for SPIR-V will be available remains to be seen, as is the official release of the Vulkan (API) itself. Source-code that has been defined as being part of GPUOpen is also part of the Linux kernel (e.g. amdgpu and amdkfd), Mesa 3D and LLVM.

==== Software development kits ====
Name	Source	API	OS	Task
Advanced Media Framework (AMF) SDK	GitHub	DirectX 12	Linux, Windows 64-bit	Light-weight, portable multimedia framework that abstracts away most of the platform and API-specific details.
AMD GPU Services (AGS) SDK	GitHub	DirectX	Windows 64-bit	
LiquidVR SDK	GitHub	Direct3D 11	Windows	improves the smoothness of virtual reality. The aim is to reduce latency between hardware so that the hardware can keep up with the user's head movement, eliminating the motion sickness. A particular focus is on dual GPU setups where each GPU will now render for one eye individually of the display
Radeon Machine Learning (RML) SDK	GitHub	DirectX 12, Metal, OpenCL	Linux, OS X, Windows	
Radeon ProRender SDK (formerly FireRender)	GitHub	OpenCL	Linux, macOS, Windows	physically-based rendering engine
RadeonRays SDK (formerly FireRays)	GitHub	DirectX 12, Vulkan	Linux 64-bit, OS X, Windows 64-bit	A high efficiency, high performance heterogeneous ray tracing intersection library for GPU and CPU or APU on any platform.
RapidFire SDK	GitHub	DirectX, OpenGL	Windows	facilitates the use of AMD's video compression acceleration SIP blocks VCE (H.264 encoder) and UVD (H.264 decoder) for "Cloud gaming"/off-site rendering
True Audio Next (TAN) SDK	GitHub	OpenCL	Windows 64-bit	SDK for Radeon GPU accelerated and multi-core high-performance audio signal processing.

=== Professional Compute ===
As of 2022, AMD compute software ecosystem is regrouped under the ROCm metaproject.

AMD Boltzmann Initiative: amdgpu (Linux kernel 4.2+) and amdkfd (Linux kernel 3.19+)

Software around Heterogeneous System Architecture (HSA), General-Purpose computing on Graphics Processing Units (GPGPU) and High-Performance Computing (HPC)

==== Radeon Open Compute (ROCm) ====
AMD's "Boltzmann Initiative" (named after Ludwig Boltzmann) was announced in November 2015 at the SuperComputing15 and productized as the Radeon Open Compute platform (ROCm). It aims to provide an alternative to Nvidia's CUDA which includes a tool to port CUDA source-code to portable (HIP) source-code which can be compiled on both HCC and NVCC.

- Radeon Open Compute Kernel (ROCK) driver
- Radeon Open Compute Runtime (ROCR) runtime
- HCC: Heterogeneous Compute Compiler
- HIP: C++ Heterogeneous-Compute Interface for Portability

==== Heterogeneous System Architecture ====
- HSAIL-GDB: provides an GNU Debugger-based debugging environment for HSA Intermediate Layer (HSAIL)
- HSA Runtime APIs
- Linux amdkfd v1.6.1 release for Kaveri & Carrizo

==== Various (deprecated) ====
- clFFT library for Fast Fourier transform written in OpenCL
- hcFFT library for Fast Fourier transform written in HCC-optimized C++

== Availability ==
GPUOpen are available under the MIT license to the general public through GitHub starting on January 26, 2016.

There is interlocking between GPUOpen and free software projects, e.g. Linux kernel, Mesa 3D and LLVM.

== See also ==
- ROCm
- AMD CodeXL
- Mantle
- Vulkan
- DLSS, Nvidia's competitor to FSR
- XeSS, Intel's competitor to FSR
