= Fanning =

Fanning may refer to:

- Fanning (bees), a behaviour of worker bees signalling an entrance to a hive
- Fanning (firearms), a shooting technique in which one hand holds a revolver and the other hits the hammer repeatedly
- Fanning (surname)
- Fanning friction factor, a dimensionless number used in fluid flow calculations
- Fan dance, a dance art form
- USS Fanning, ships of the United States Navy

== Places ==
- Cape Fanning, Antarctica
- Fanning Ridge, South Georgia Island
- Fanning, Kansas, United States
- Fanning, Missouri, United States
- Tabuaeran, also known as Fanning Atoll or Fanning Island, one of the Line Islands of the central Pacific Ocean

== See also ==
- Fan (disambiguation)
