= NVCC (disambiguation) =

NVCC is an initialism that may refer to:

- Northern Virginia Community College, a network of community colleges throughout Northern Virginia
- Naugatuck Valley Community College, a community college in Waterbury, Connecticut
- NVIDIA CUDA Compiler, a compiler for parallel CUDA codes
