= Geometric primitive =

Basic shapes represented in vector graphics

Vector graphics consists of geometrical primitives.

In vector computer graphics, CAD systems, and geographic information systems, a geometric primitive (or prim) is the simplest (i.e. 'atomic' or irreducible) geometric shape that the system can handle (draw or store). Sometimes the subroutines that draw the corresponding objects are called "geometric primitives" as well. The most basic primitives are point and straight line segments, which were all that early vector graphics systems had.

Modern 2D computer graphics systems may operate with primitives which are curves (segments of straight lines, circles and more complicated curves), as well as shapes (rectangles, arbitrary polygons, circles). A common set of two-dimensional primitives includes lines, points, and polygons, although some people prefer to consider triangles primitives, because every polygon can be constructed from triangles (polygon triangulation). All other graphic elements are built up from these primitives.

In constructive solid geometry, primitives are simple geometric solids such as a cube, cylinder, sphere, cone, pyramid, torus. In three dimensions, triangles or polygons positioned in three-dimensional space can be used as primitives to model more complex 3D forms. In some cases, curves (such as Bézier curves, circles, etc.) may be considered primitives; in other cases, curves are complex forms created from many straight, primitive shapes.

== Common primitives ==
The set of geometric primitives is based on the dimension of the region being represented:

- Point (0-dimensional), a single location with no height, width, or depth.
- Line or curve (1-dimensional), having length but no width, although a linear feature may curve through a higher-dimensional space.
- Planar surface or curved surface (2-dimensional), having length and width.
- Volumetric region or solid (3-dimensional), having length, width, and depth.

In GIS, the terrain surface is often spoken of colloquially as "2 1/2 dimensional," because only the upper surface needs to be represented. Thus, elevation can be conceptualized as a scalar field property or function of two-dimensional space, affording it a number of data modeling efficiencies over true 3-dimensional objects. A shape of any of these dimensions greater than zero consists of an infinite number of distinct points. Because digital systems are finite, only a sample set of the points in a shape can be stored. Thus, vector data structures typically represent geometric primitives using a strategic sample, organized in structures that facilitate the software interpolating the remainder of the shape at the time of analysis or display, using the algorithms of Computational geometry.

- A Point is a single coordinate in a Cartesian coordinate system. Some data models allow for Multipoint features consisting of several disconnected points.

A simple polyline

- A Polygonal chain or Polyline is an ordered list of points (termed vertices in this context). The software is expected to interpolate the intervening shape of the line between adjacent points in the list as a parametric curve, most commonly a straight line, but other types of curves are frequently available, including circular arcs, cubic splines, and Bézier curves. Some of these curves require additional points to be defined that are not on the line itself, but are used for parametric control.
- A Polygon is a polyline that closes at its endpoints, representing the boundary of a two-dimensional region. The software is expected to use this boundary to partition 2-dimensional space into an interior and exterior. Some data models allow for a single feature to consist of multiple polylines, which could collectively connect to form a single closed boundary, could represent a set of disjoint regions (e.g., the state of Hawaii), or could represent a region with holes (e.g., a lake with an island).

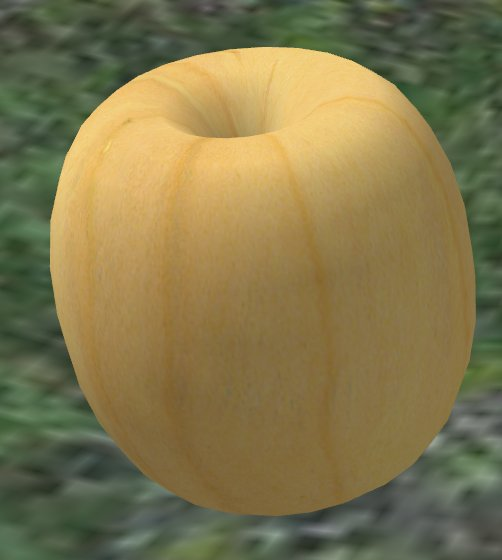
A 3D torus prim created in Second Life, an example of a parametric shape

- A Parametric shape is a standardized two-dimensional or three-dimensional shape defined by a minimal set of parameters, such as an ellipse defined by two points at its foci, or three points at its center, vertex, and co-vertex.
- A Polyhedron or Polygon mesh is a set of polygon faces in three-dimensional space that are connected at their edges to completely enclose a volumetric region. In some applications, closure may not be required or may be implied, such as modeling terrain. The software is expected to use this surface to partition 3-dimensional space into an interior and exterior. A triangle mesh is a subtype of polyhedron in which all faces must be triangles, the only polygon that will always be planar, including the Triangulated irregular network (TIN) commonly used in GIS.

A NURBS surface

- A parametric mesh represents a three-dimensional surface by a connected set of parametric functions, similar to a spline or Bézier curve in two dimensions. The most common structure is the Non-uniform rational B-spline (NURBS), supported by most CAD and animation software.

== Application in GIS ==
A wide variety of vector data structures and formats have been developed during the history of Geographic information systems, but they share a fundamental basis of storing a core set of geometric primitives to represent the location and extent of geographic phenomena. Locations of points are almost always measured within a standard Earth-based coordinate system, whether the spherical Geographic coordinate system (latitude/longitude), or a planar coordinate system, such as the Universal Transverse Mercator. They also share the need to store a set of attributes of each geographic feature alongside its shape; traditionally, this has been accomplished using the data models, data formats, and even software of relational databases.

Early vector formats, such as POLYVRT, the ARC/INFO Coverage, and the Esri shapefile support a basic set of geometric primitives: points, polylines, and polygons, only in two dimensional space and the latter two with only straight line interpolation. TIN data structures for representing terrain surfaces as triangle meshes were also added. Since the mid 1990s, new formats have been developed that extend the range of available primitives, generally standardized by the Open Geospatial Consortium's Simple Features specification. Common geometric primitive extensions include: three-dimensional coordinates for points, lines, and polygons; a fourth "dimension" to represent a measured attribute or time; curved segments in lines and polygons; text annotation as a form of geometry; and polygon meshes for three-dimensional objects.

Frequently, a representation of the shape of a real-world phenomenon may have a different (usually lower) dimension than the phenomenon being represented. For example, a city (a two-dimensional region) may be represented as a point, or a road (a three-dimensional volume of material) may be represented as a line. This dimensional generalization correlates with tendencies in spatial cognition. For example, asking the distance between two cities presumes a conceptual model of the cities as points, while giving directions involving travel "up," "down," or "along" a road imply a one-dimensional conceptual model. This is frequently done for purposes of data efficiency, visual simplicity, or cognitive efficiency, and is acceptable if the distinction between the representation and the represented is understood, but can cause confusion if information users assume that the digital shape is a perfect representation of reality (i.e., believing that roads really are lines).

== In 3D modelling ==
In CAD software or 3D modelling, the interface may present the user with the ability to create primitives which may be further modified by edits. For example, in the practice of box modelling the user will start with a cuboid, then use extrusion and other operations to create the model. In this use the primitive is just a convenient starting point, rather than the fundamental unit of modelling.

A 3D package may also include a list of extended primitives which are more complex shapes that come with the package. For example, a teapot is listed as a primitive in 3D Studio Max.

== In graphics hardware ==
Various graphics accelerators exist with hardware acceleration for rendering specific primitives such as lines or triangles, frequently with texture mapping and shaders. Modern 3D accelerators typically accept sequences of triangles as triangle strips.

== See also ==
- 2D geometric model
- Sculpted prim
- Simplex
