= FANS =

FANS may refer to:

- the ICAO code for Nelspruit Airport
- a flight navigation system Future Air Navigation System

== See also ==
- Fan (disambiguation), for the singular of FANs
