= Nvidia GameWorks =

Middleware software suite by Nvidia

- Developer: Nvidia
- Initial release: 2014
- Operating system: Windows
- Platform: Windows, PlayStation 4, Wii U, Xbox One, Xbox Series X, Xbox Series S, PlayStation 5, Android
- Type: Video game development middleware
- License: Proprietary/Commercial
- Website: developer.nvidia.com/gameworks
- Repository: github.com/NVIDIAGameWorks

Nvidia GameWorks is a middleware software suite developed by Nvidia. The Visual FX, PhysX, and Optix SDKs provide a wide range of enhancements pre-optimized for Nvidia GPUs. GameWorks is partially open-source.

The competing solution being in development by AMD is GPUOpen, which was announced to be free and open-source software under the MIT License.

== Components ==
Nvidia Gameworks consists of several main components:

- VisualFX: For rendering effects such as smoke, fire, water, depth of field, soft shadows, HBAO+, TXAA, FaceWorks, and HairWorks.
- PhysX: For physics, destruction, particle and fluid simulations.
- OptiX: For baked lighting and general-purpose ray-tracing.
- Core SDK: For facilitating development on Nvidia hardware.

In addition, the suite contains sample code for DirectX and OpenGL developers, as well as tools for debugging, profiling, optimization, and Android development.

== See also ==
- PhysX
- GPUOpen
- TressFX
- Havok (software)
