= The Fan =

The Fan can refer to:

== Places ==
- Fan district, a neighborhood in Richmond, Virginia
- Beijing National Indoor Stadium (nicknamed: The Fan), Beijing, China; a facility built for the 2008 Olympics, and used in the 2022 Olympics/Paralympics

== Literature ==
- The Fan (play), 1763 and 1765 comedy by Carlo Goldoni
- The Fan (Abrahams novel), a 1995 novel by US author Peter Abrahams
- The Fan (Randall novel)

== Films and TV ==
- The Fan (1949 film), starring Martita Hunt and directed by Otto Preminger
- The Fan (1981 film), starring Lauren Bacall, James Garner, Michael Biehn and Maureen Stapleton based on The Fan, a 1977 novel by author Bob Randall
- Der Fan (1982), starring Désirée Nosbusch and Bodo Steiger
- The Fan (1996 film), starring Robert De Niro and Wesley Snipes, and directed by Tony Scott
- La Fan, Mexican telenovela 2017
- "The Fan", the fifth episode of the Tenacious D TV series
- "The Fan" (The Amazing World of Gumball), a season 3 television episode of The Amazing World of Gumball
- The Fan, a villain from anime Triangle Heart
- The Fan, 2018 South Korean TV variety, SBS
- The Fan (rugby league), a Fox League show

== Radio ==
=== Canada ===
- Sportsnet 590 The Fan, Calgary, Alberta, Canada
- Sportsnet 960 The Fan, Toronto

=== United States ===
- 106.7 The Fan, Washington D.C. area
- WFAN (AM), New York City
- WFAN-FM, New York City

== Other uses ==
- The Fan (card game), another name for La Belle Lucie, a patience game

== See also ==
- Fan (disambiguation)
