= Fanning (surname) =

Fanning is a surname of Irish origin. Notable people with the surname include:

- Bede Fanning (1885–1970), Australian public servant
- Bernard Fanning (born 1969), Australian musician, best known for his role as the lead singer of the Australian rock band Powderfinger
- Buist M. Fanning (born 1949), American biblical Greek scholar
- Dakota Fanning (born 1994), American actress and older sister of Elle
- Dave Fanning, Irish television and radio host
- Edmund Fanning (1769–1841), American explorer
- Edmund Fanning (colonial administrator) (1739–1818), American-born administrator for the British government in New York and Loyalist; later a governor in Canada
- Elle Fanning (born 1998), American actress and younger sister of Dakota
- Ellen Fanning, Australian TV journalist
- Eric Kenneth Fanning (born 1968), United States Secretary of the Army
- Fred Fanning (1921–1993), Australian rules footballer
- Jim Fanning (1927–2015), catcher, manager and front office executive in Major League Baseball
- Jimmy Valiant (born James Harold Fanning, 1942), American retired professional wrestler
- Juan Fanning (1824–1881), Peruvian naval officer and war hero
- Kay Fanning (1927–2000), American newspaper editor and publisher, first American woman to edit a national newspaper
- Ken Fanning (born 1947), American wilderness guide and retired politician
- Mick Fanning (born 1981), Australian professional surfer
- Mike Fanning (American football) (1953–2022), American football player
- Nathaniel Fanning (1755–1804), American naval officer and war hero
- Ronan Fanning (1941–2017), Irish historian
- Shawn Fanning (born 1980), computer programmer and creator of the original Napster application
- Thomas A. Fanning (a.k.a. Tom Fanning), American chief executive.
- Vincent Fanning, Irish, first manager of Cork Airport (1961).
