= Fandom (disambiguation) =

A fandom is a subculture of people sharing a common interest.

Fandom may also refer to:

- Fandom (website), a wiki hosting service
- Fandom (album), by Waterparks
- The Fandom, a documentary film about the furry fandom
