= Badouel intersection algorithm =

The Badouel ray-triangle intersection algorithm, named after its inventor Didier Badouel, is a fast method for calculating the intersection of a ray and a triangle in three dimensions without needing precomputation of the plane equation of the plane containing the triangle.
