= Fayum mummy portraits =

Portraits attached to mummies in Egypt during Roman period

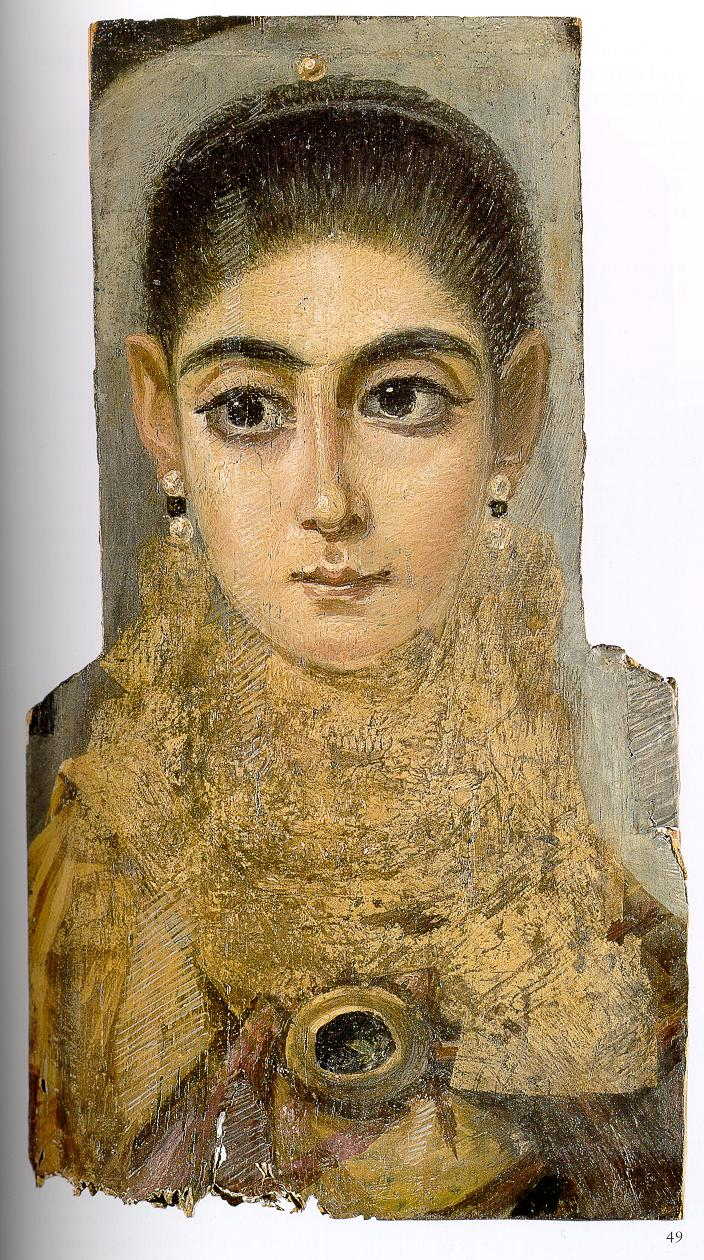
Mummy portrait of a young woman, Antinoöpolis, Middle Egypt, 2nd century, Louvre, Paris.

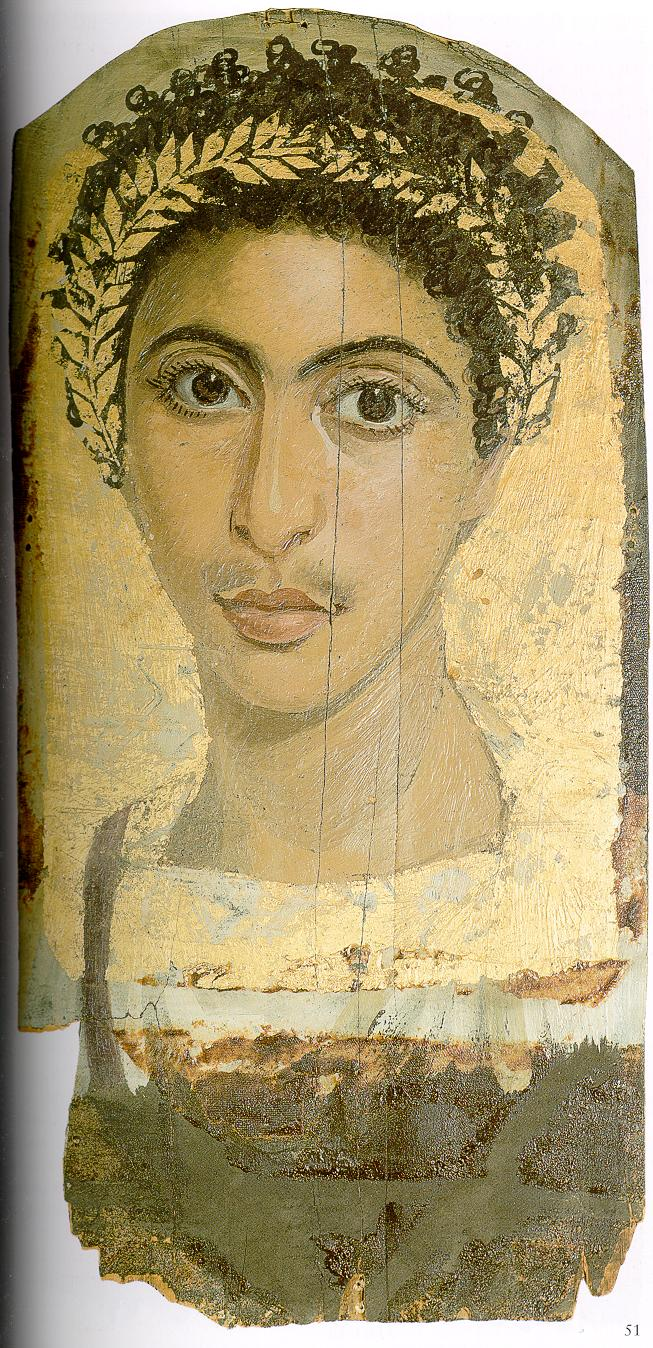
This heavily gilt portrait was found in Antinoöpolis in winter 1905/06 by French Archaeologist Alfred Gayet and sold to the Egyptian Museum of Berlin in 1907.

Mummy portraits or Fayum mummy portraits are a type of naturalistic encaustic portrait typically painted on wooden boards attached to the mummies of upper class Egyptians and probably non Egyptian individuals living in Egypt during the Roman period. They belong to the tradition of panel painting, one of the most highly regarded forms of art in the Classical world. The Fayum portraits are the only large body of art from that tradition to have survived.

Mummy portraits have been found across Egypt, but are most common in the Faiyum Basin, particularly from Hawara and the Hadrianic Roman city Antinoopolis. "Faiyum portraits" is generally used as a stylistic, rather than a geographic, description. While painted cartonnage mummy cases date back to pharaonic times, the Faiyum mummy portraits were an innovation dating to the time of Roman rule in Egypt. The portraits date to the Imperial Roman era, from the late 1st century BC or the early 1st century AD onwards. It is not clear when their production ended, but some research suggests the middle of the 3rd century. They are among the largest groups among the very few survivors of the panel painting tradition of the classical world, which continued into Byzantine, Eastern Mediterranean, and Western traditions in the post-classical world, including the local tradition of Coptic Christian iconography in Egypt.

The portraits covered the faces of bodies that were mummified for burial. Extant examples indicate that they were mounted into the bands of cloth that were used to wrap the bodies. Almost all have now been detached from the mummies. They usually depict a single person, showing the head, or head and upper chest, viewed frontally. In terms of artistic tradition, the images clearly derive more from Greco-Roman artistic traditions than Egyptian ones. Two groups of portraits can be distinguished by technique: one of encaustic (wax) paintings, the other in tempera. The former are usually of higher quality.

About 900 mummy portraits are known at present. The majority were found in the necropolis of Faiyum. Due to the hot dry Egyptian climate, the paintings are frequently very well preserved, often retaining their brilliant colours seemingly unfaded by time.

== Materials and techniques ==
A majority of images show a formal portrait of a single figure, facing and looking toward the viewer, from an angle that is usually slightly turned from full face. The figures are presented as busts against a monochrome background which in some instances are decorated. The individuals are both male and female and range in age from childhood to old age.

=== Painted surface ===
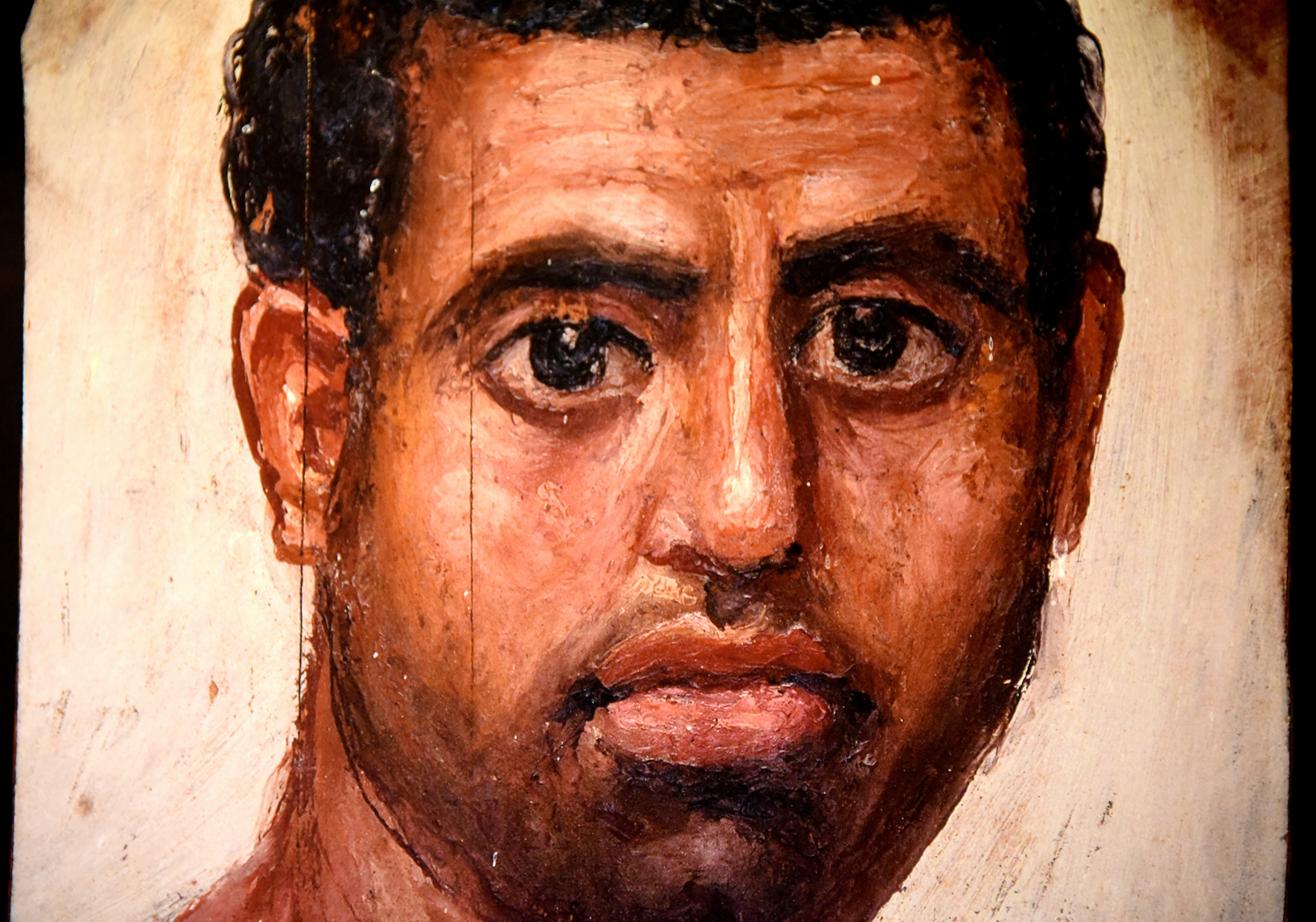
Mummy portrait of a man from Fayum. Encaustic on limewood, AD 80–100. British Museum

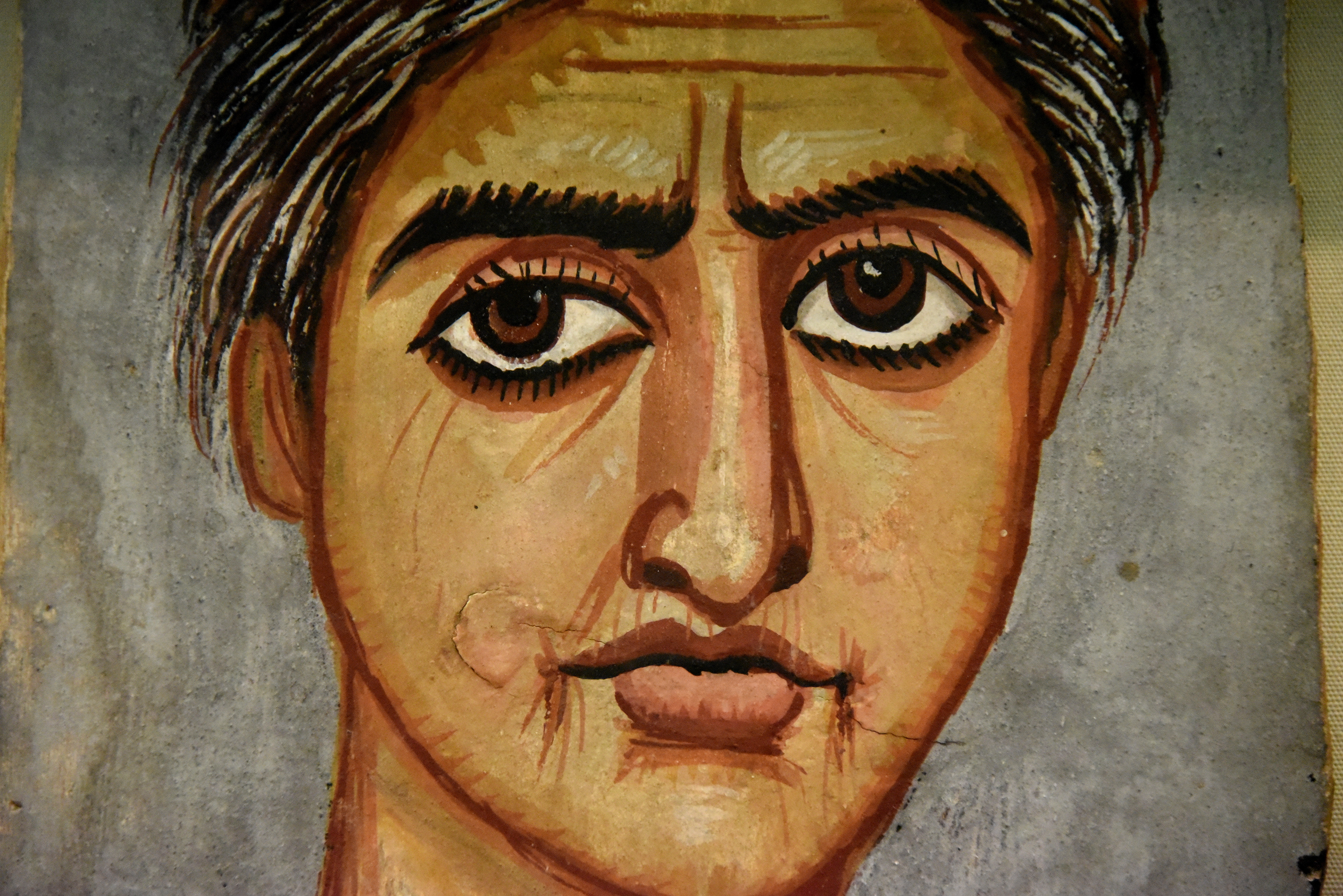
Mummy portrait of a woman from Fayum, Hawara, modern-day Egypt. Encaustic on wood, AD 300–325. British Museum

The majority of preserved mummy portraits were painted on boards or panels, made from different imported hardwoods, including oak, lime, sycamore, cedar, cypress, fig, and citrus. The wood was cut into thin rectangular panels and made smooth. The finished panels were set into layers of wrapping that enclosed the body and were surrounded by bands of cloth, giving the effect of a window-like opening through which the face of the deceased could be seen. Portraits were sometimes painted directly onto the canvas or rags of the mummy wrapping (cartonnage painting).

=== Painting techniques ===
The wooden surface was sometimes primed for painting with a layer of plaster. In some cases the primed layer reveals a preparatory drawing. Two painting techniques were employed: encaustic (wax) painting and animal glue tempera. The encaustic images are striking because of the contrast between vivid and rich colours, and comparatively large brush-strokes, producing an "Impressionistic" effect. The tempera paintings have a finer gradation of tones and chalkier colours, giving a more restrained appearance. In some cases, gold leaf was used to depict jewellery and wreaths. There also are examples of hybrid techniques or of variations from the main techniques.

The Fayum portraits reveal a wide range of painterly expertise and skill in presenting a lifelike appearance. The naturalism of the portraits is often revealed in knowledge of anatomic structure and in skilled modelling of the form by the use of light and shade, which gives an appearance of three-dimensionality to most of the figures. The graded flesh tones are enhanced with shadows and highlights indicative of directional lighting.

== Subjects and social context of the paintings ==
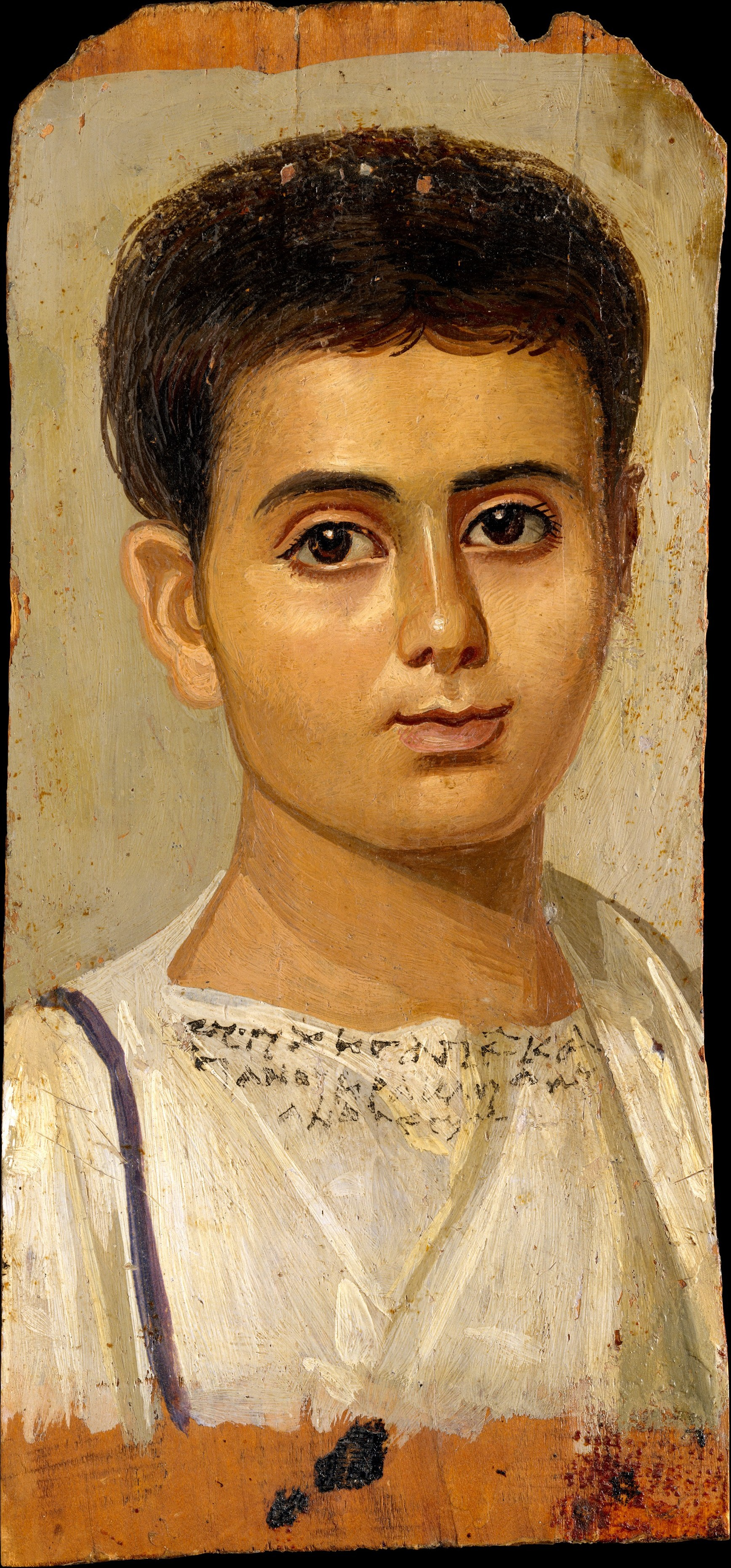
Portrait of a boy, identified by inscription as Eutyches (Greek: Ευτύχης), Metropolitan Museum of Art

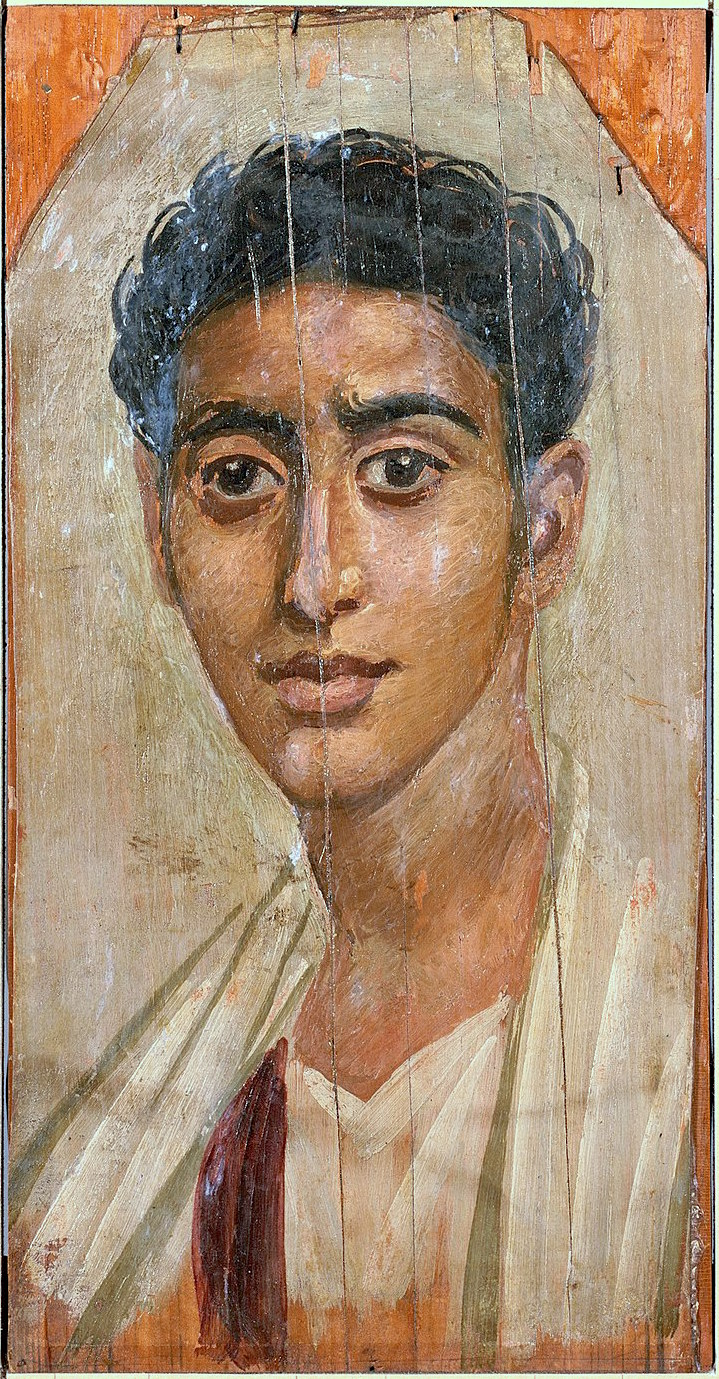
A portrait from the late 1st century AD. Walters Art Museum, Baltimore.

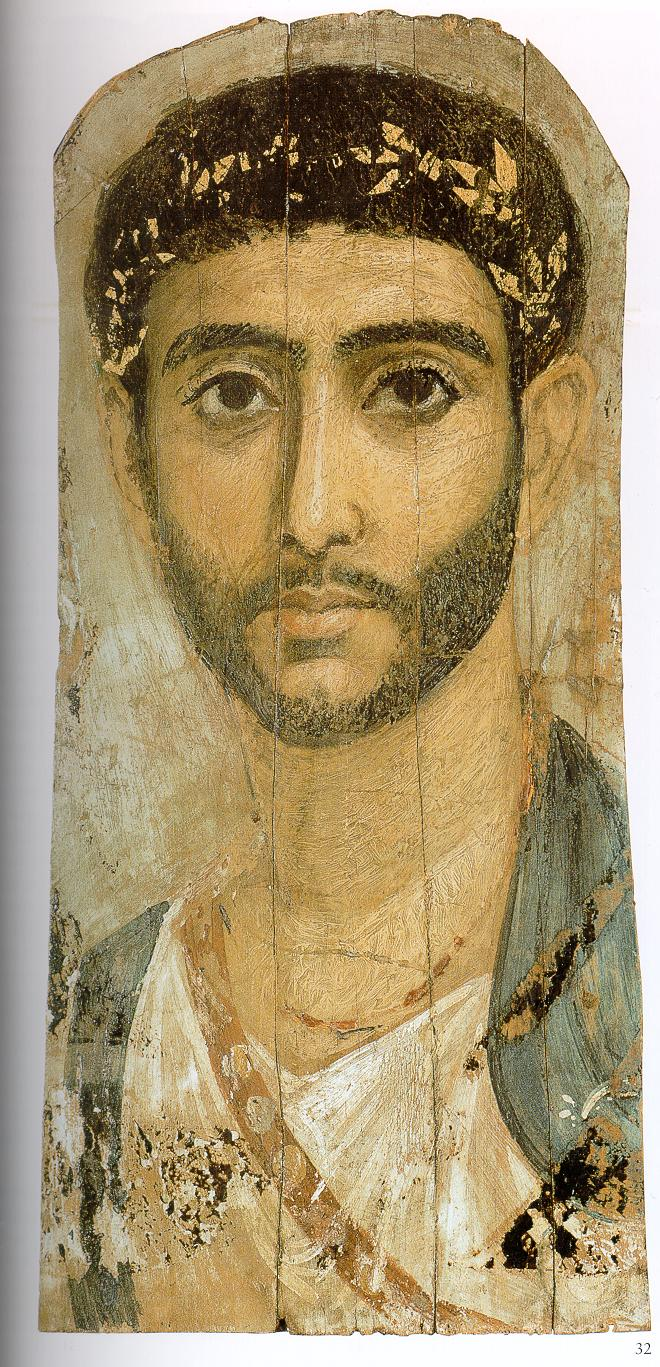
Man with sword belt, Altes Museum.

=== People of Fayum ===
Under Hellenistic rule, Egypt hosted several Greek settlements, mostly concentrated in Alexandria, but also in a few other cities, where Greek settlers lived alongside some seven to ten million native Egyptians, or possibly a total of three to five million for all ethnicities, according to lower estimates. Faiyum's earliest Greek inhabitants were soldier-veterans and cleruchs (elite military officials) who were settled by the Ptolemaic kings on reclaimed lands. Native Egyptians also came to settle in Faiyum from all over the country, notably the Nile Delta, Upper Egypt, Oxyrhynchus and Memphis, to undertake the labor involved in the land reclamation process, as attested by personal names, local cults and recovered papyri. It is estimated that as much as 30 percent of the population of Faiyum was Greek during the Ptolemaic period, with the rest being native Egyptians. By the Roman period, much of the "Greek" population of Faiyum was made-up of either Hellenized Egyptians or people of mixed Egyptian-Greek origins. Later, in the Roman Period, many veterans of the Roman army, who, initially at least, were not Egyptian but people from disparate cultural and ethnic backgrounds, settled in the area after the completion of their service, and formed social relations and intermarried with local populations.

While commonly believed to depict Greek settlers in Egypt, the Faiyum portraits instead reflect the complex synthesis of the predominant Egyptian culture and that of the elite Greek minority in the city. According to Walker, the early Ptolemaic Greek colonists married local women and adopted Egyptian religious beliefs, and by Roman times, their descendants were viewed as Egyptians by the Roman rulers, despite their own self-perception of being Greek.

The portraits are said to represent both descendants of ancient Greek mercenaries, who had fought for Alexander the Great, settled in Egypt and married local women, as well as native Egyptians who were the majority, many of whom had adopted Greek or Latin names, then seen as 'status symbols'.

A DNA study showed genetic continuity between the Pre-Ptolemaic, Ptolemaic and Roman populations of Egypt, indicating that foreign rule impacted Egypt's population only to a very limited degree at the genetic level.

In terms of anthropological characteristics, academic Alan K. Bowman stated that based on skull analysis, the Faiyum mummy burials were said to be the same as 'native' Egyptians of the Pharaonic era. The dental morphology of the Roman-period Faiyum mummies was also compared with that of earlier Egyptian populations, and was found to be "much more closely akin" to that of ancient Egyptians, than to Greeks or other European populations. This conclusion was seen again in 2009, by Joel D. Irish, where he noted: "Interestingly, Roman period Hawara in Lower Egypt seems not to have been composed of migrants-while there is a possibility that the dynastic occupation of Saqqara may have been."

=== Age profile of those depicted ===
Most of the portraits depict the deceased at a relatively young age, and many show children. According to Susan Walker, C.A.T. scans reveal a correspondence of age and sex between mummy and image. She concludes that the age distribution reflects the low life expectancy at the time. A number of portraits of adolescent males indicate some form of facial hair either on the chin or upper lip. There are no real attestations for growth of facial hair in Egyptian culture given the culture of hairlessness as a manifestation of cleanliness. This indicates perhaps a deep cultural influence from the Greeks rather than the Romans, as emphasis would be on the removal of facial hair. Egyptologist Dominic Monserrat concludes that this detail could indicate the depicted deceased would have died according to Greek cultural values "at his optimum sexual vitality and attractiveness."

=== Social status ===
The patrons of the portraits apparently belonged to the affluent upper class of military personnel, civil servants and religious dignitaries. Not everyone could afford a mummy portrait; many mummies were found without one. Flinders Petrie states that only one or two percent of the mummies he excavated were embellished with portraits. The rates for mummy portraits do not survive, but it can be assumed that the material caused higher costs than the labour, since in antiquity, painters were appreciated as craftsmen rather than as artists. The situation from the "Tomb of Aline" is interesting in this regard. It contained four mummies: those of Aline, of two children and of her husband. Unlike his wife and children, the latter was not equipped with a portrait but with a gilt three-dimensional mask. Perhaps plaster masks were preferred if they could be afforded.

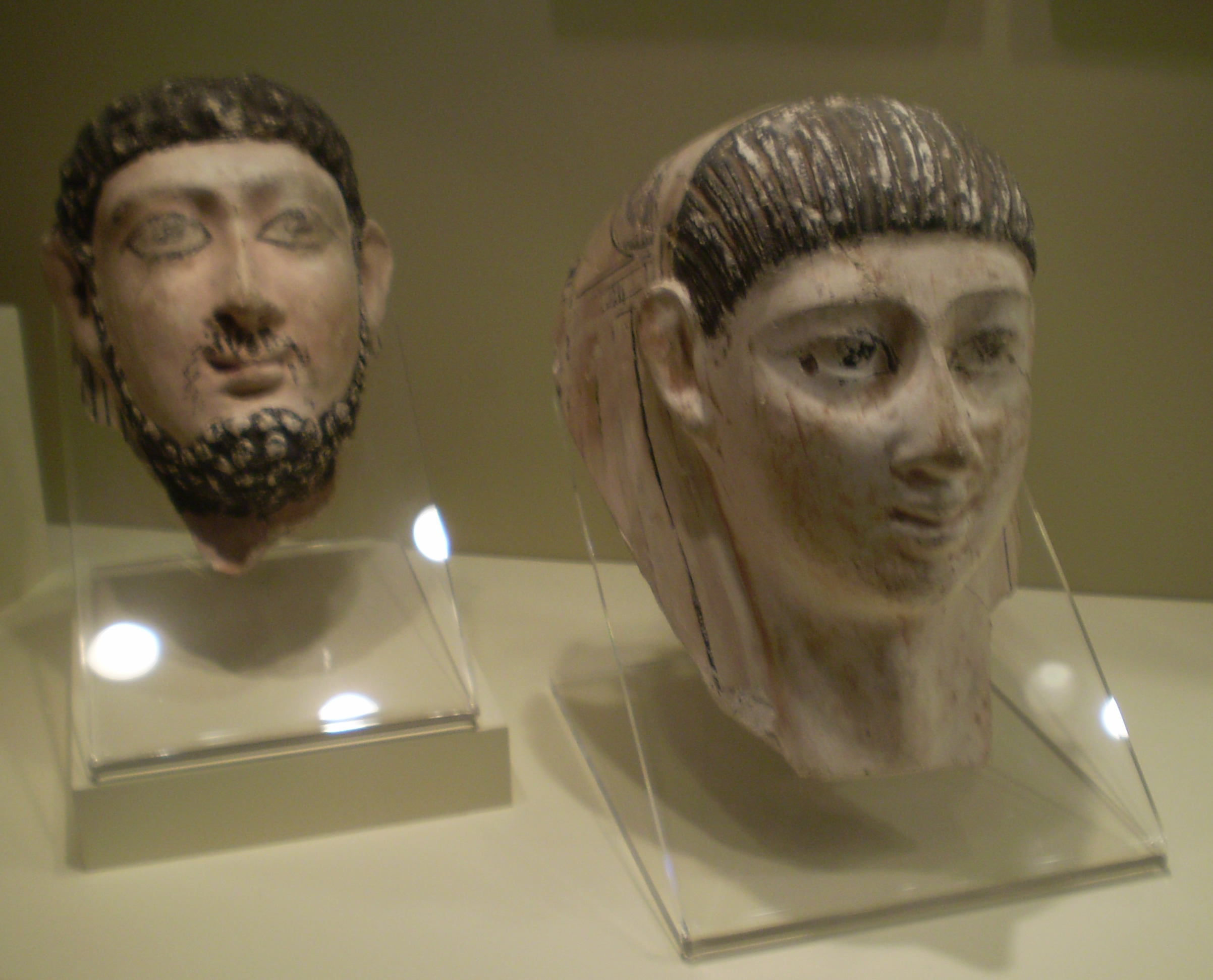
Three-dimensional funerary masks of painted plaster from Faiyum (1st century), Montreal Museum of Fine Arts.

Based on literary, archaeological and genetic studies, it appears that those depicted were native Egyptians, who had adopted the dominant Greco-Roman culture.

Hairstyles and clothing are always influenced by Roman fashion. Women and children are often depicted wearing valuable ornaments and fine garments, men often wearing specific and elaborate outfits. Men with beards were seen as having masculinity, maturity, and high social status. They were seen to have wisdom. Greek inscriptions of names are relatively common, sometimes they include professions. It is not known whether such inscriptions always reflect reality, or whether they may state ideal conditions or aspirations rather than true conditions. One single inscription is known to definitely indicate the deceased's profession (a shipowner) correctly. The mummy of a woman named Hermione also included the term γραμματική (grammatike). For a long time, it was assumed that this indicated that she was a teacher by profession; for this reason, Flinders Petrie donated the portrait to Girton College, Cambridge, the first residential college for women in Britain. However, today, it is assumed that the term indicates her level of education. Some portraits of men show sword-belts or even pommels, suggesting that they were members of the Roman military.

== Culture-historical context ==
=== Production of the paintings ===
For a long time it was believed that the Fayum portraits were produced during the lifetime of their subjects and displayed as "salon paintings" within their houses, to be added to their mummy wrapping after their death. In addition, much debate continues on whether or not these portraits were painted from first hand observation of the subjects. This concept of painting from real subjects and display reflects a more modern and predominantly Western view of portrait making. Rather newer research suggests that they were painted by other means perhaps even after the death of an individual. Physical evidence is not concrete, however, textual evidence such as from Pliny the Elder states "realistic portraiture indeed has for many generations been the highest ambition of art", demonstrating that capturing the likeness of an individual as being valued in the ancient world.

=== Changes in burial habits ===
The burial habits of Ptolemaic Egyptians mostly followed ancient traditions. The bodies of members of the upper classes were mummified, equipped with a decorated coffin and a mummy mask to cover the head. The Greeks who entered Egypt at that time mostly followed their own habits. There is evidence from Alexandria and other sites indicating that they practised the Greek tradition of cremation. This broadly reflects the general situation in Hellenistic Egypt, its rulers proclaiming themselves to be pharaohs but otherwise living in an entirely Hellenistic world, incorporating only very few local elements. Conversely, the Egyptians only slowly developed an interest in the Greek-Hellenic culture that dominated the East Mediterranean since the conquests of Alexander. This situation changed substantially with the arrival of the Romans. Within a few generations, all Egyptian elements disappeared from everyday life. Cities like Karanis or Oxyrhynchus are largely Greco-Roman places. There is clear evidence that this resulted from a mixing of different ethnicities in the ruling classes of Roman Egypt.

=== Religious continuity ===
Only in the sphere of religion is there evidence for a continuation of Egyptian traditions. Egyptian temples were erected as late as the 2nd century. In terms of burial habits, Egyptian and Hellenistic elements now mixed. Coffins became increasingly unpopular and went entirely out of use by the 2nd century. In contrast, mummification appears to have been practised by large parts of the population. The mummy mask, originally an Egyptian concept, grew more and more Graeco-Roman in style, Egyptian motifs became ever rarer. The adoption of Roman portrait painting into Egyptian burial cult belongs in this general context.

=== Link with Roman funeral masks ===
Some authors suggest that the idea of such portraits may be related to the custom among the Roman nobility of displaying imagines, images of their ancestors, in the atrium of their house. In funeral processions, these wax masks were worn by professional mourners to emphasize the continuity of an illustrious family line, but originally perhaps to represent a deeper evocation of the presence of the dead. Roman festivals such as the Parentalia as well as everyday domestic rituals cultivated ancestral spirits (see also veneration of the dead). The development of mummy portraiture may represent a combination of Egyptian and Roman funerary practices, since it appears only after Egypt was established as a Roman province.

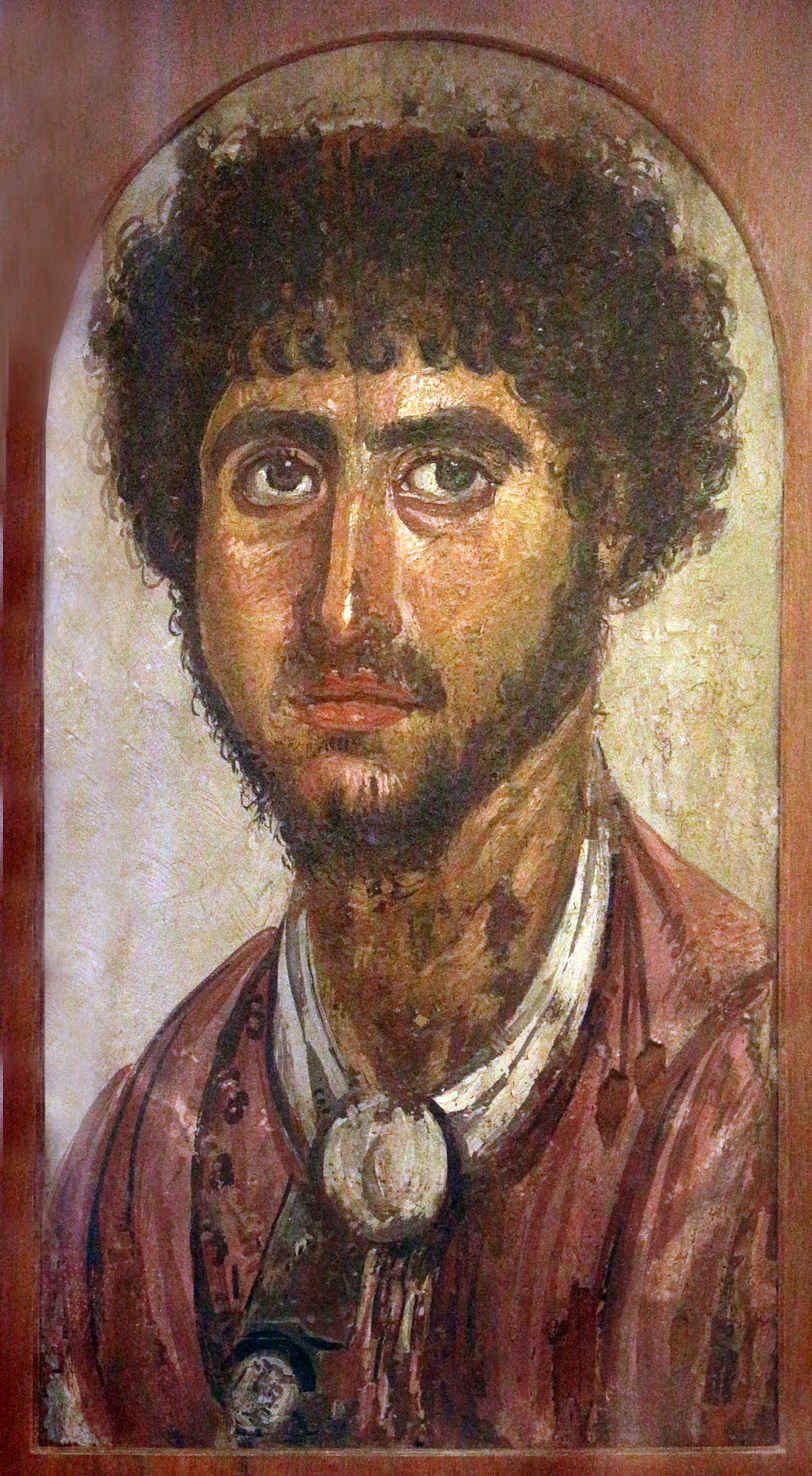
Fayum mummy portrait of a man, 1st century AD, Oriental Institute, Chicago

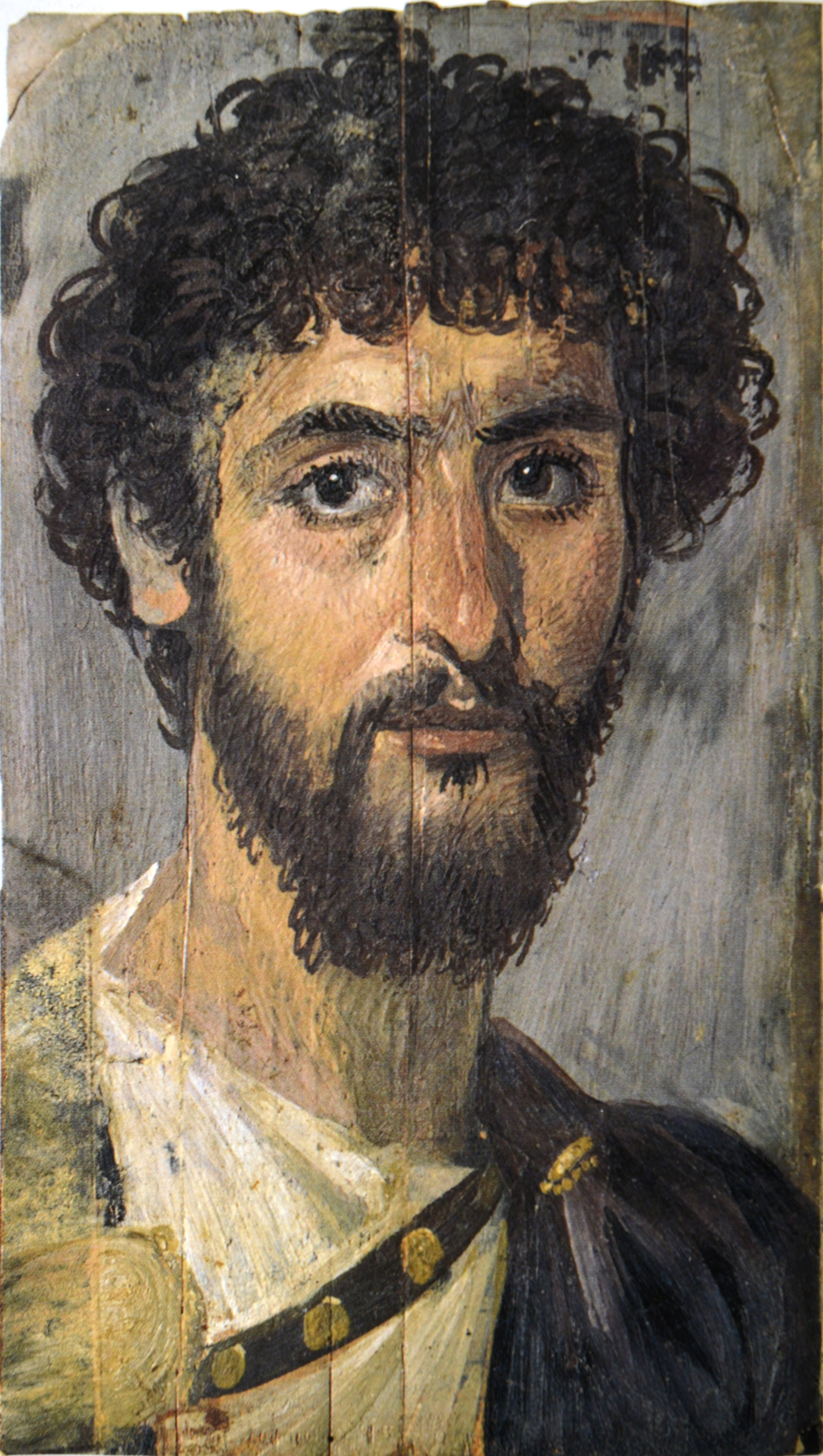
Fayum portrait of a man, mid-2nd century, Myers Collection, Eton College.

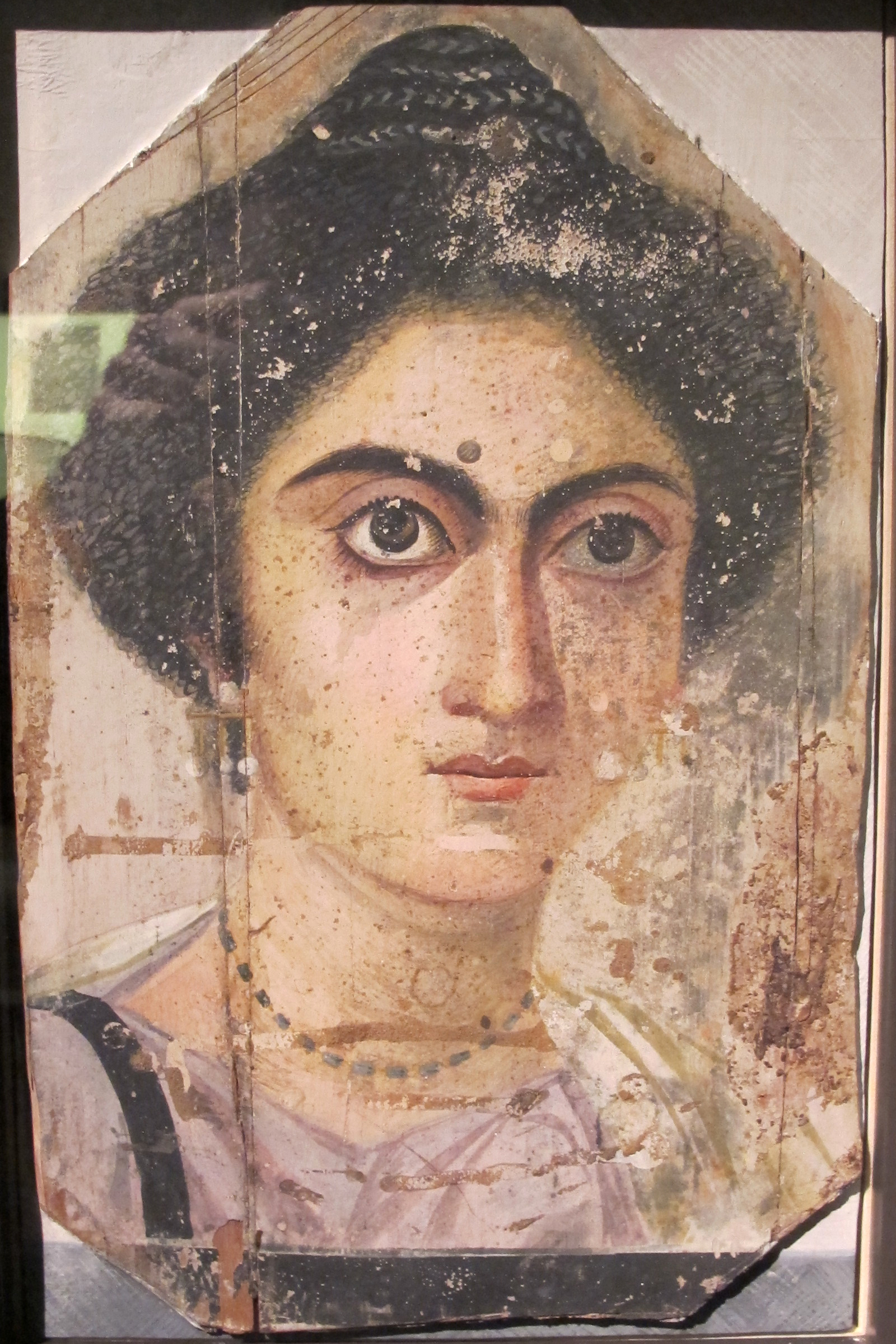
Fayum portrait of a woman, 4th century, Museo archeologico nazionale, Florence

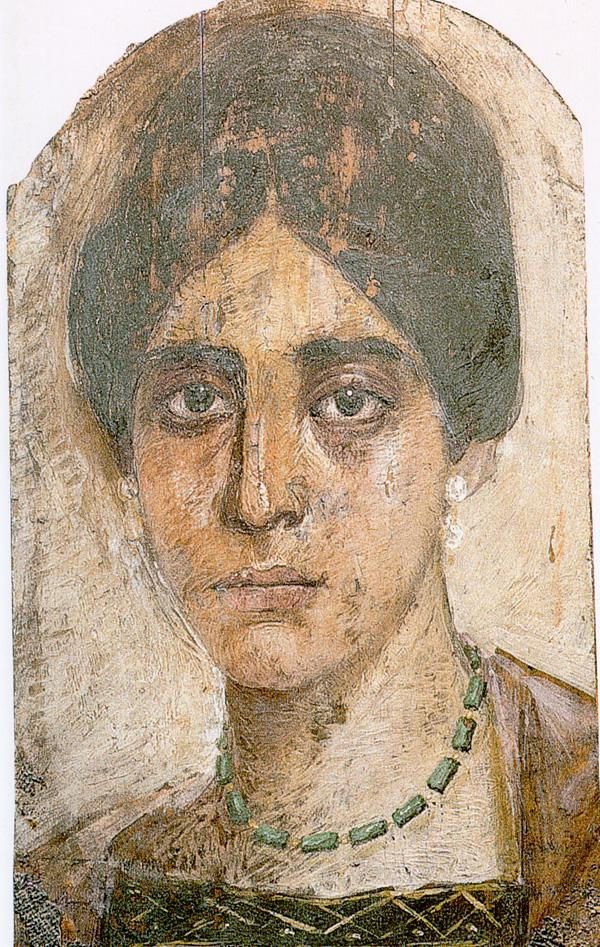
Fayum portrait of a woman, 2nd century, Manchester Museum, University of Manchester

=== Style ===
The combination of naturalistic Greek portrait of the deceased with Egyptian-form deities, symbols, and frame was primarily phenomenon of funerary art from the chora, or countryside, in Roman Egypt. Combining Egyptian and Greek pictorial forms or motifs was not restricted to funerary art, however: the public and highly visible portraits of Ptolemaic dynasts and Roman emperors grafted iconography developed for a ruler's Greek or Roman images onto Egyptian statues in the dress and posture of Egyptian kings and queens. The possible combinations of Greek and Egyptian elements can be elucidated by imposing a (somewhat artificial) distinction between form and content, where 'form' is taken as the system of representation, and 'content' as the symbol, concept, or figure being portrayed.

== Mummy portraits as sources on provincial Roman fashion ==
=== Provincial fashions ===
Mummy portraits depict a variety of different Roman hairstyles. They are one of the main aids in dating the paintings. The majority of the deceased were depicted with hairstyles then in fashion. They are frequently similar to those depicted in sculpture. As part of Roman propaganda, such sculptures, especially those depicting the imperial family, were often displayed throughout the empire. Thus, they had a direct influence on the development of fashion. Nevertheless, the mummy portraits, as well as other finds, suggest that fashions lasted longer in the provinces than in the imperial court, or at least that diverse styles might coexist.

=== Hairstyles ===
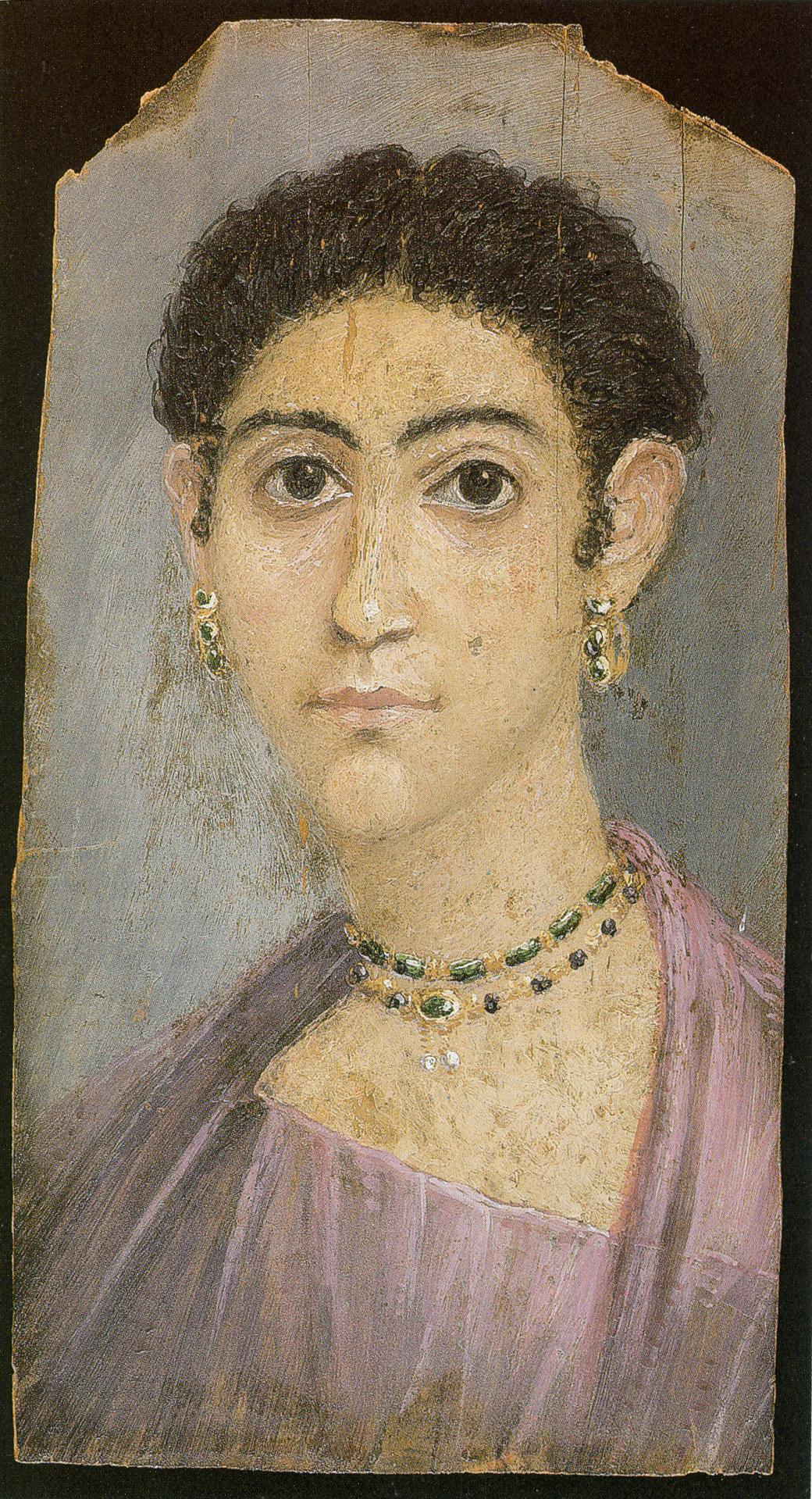
Depiction of a woman with curly hair, wearing a violet chiton and cloak and pendant earrings. British Museum

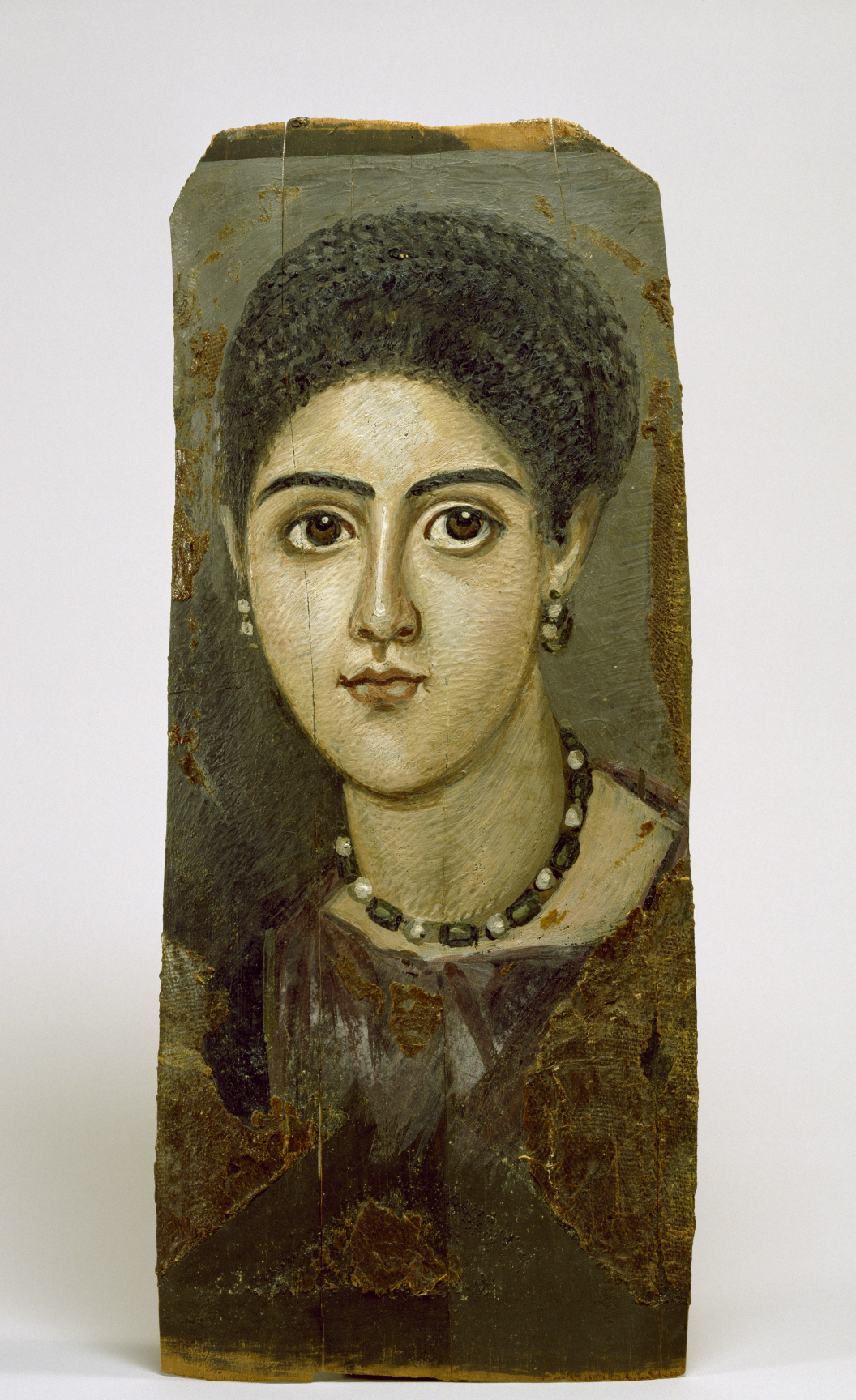
The plaited hairstyle of this elite woman makes it possible to date this painting to the reign of Trajan (98–117). Walters Art Museum

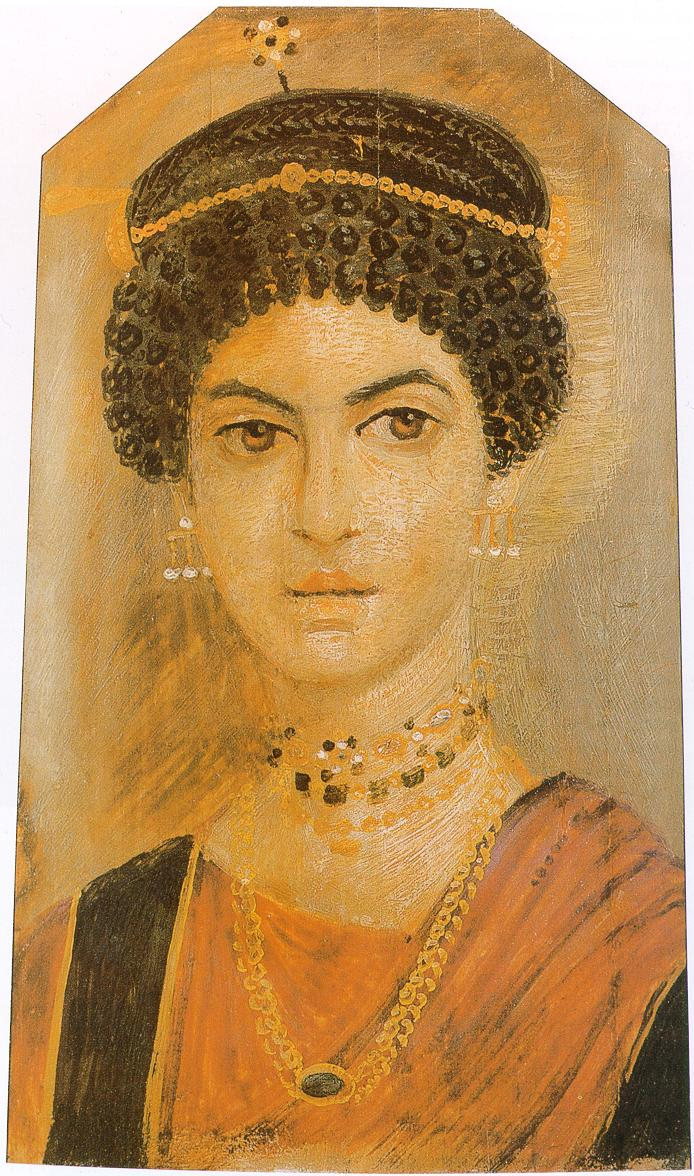
Depiction of a woman with a ringlet hairstyle, an orange chiton with black bands and rod-shaped earrings. Museum of Scotland

Comparing the hairstyles on mummy portraits, it is revealed that the vast majority of them correspond to the fast-changing fashion of hairstyles used by the elite of the rest of the Roman Empire. They, in turn, often followed the fashion of the Roman emperors and their wives, whose images and coiffures can be dated through their depictions on coins. The female hairstyles are what is usually used for the dating of mummy portraits, because other than a number of elite boys who had long hair parted on the forehead and bound into a bun in the neck, male hairstyle does not differ by much. This is because Roman male was advised to avoid excessive attention to hairstyles as he may be criticized for unmanliness. Complex ringlets with nested plaits, and curls over the forehead was popular in the late first century, with small oval nested plaits popular in the time of Antonines. A later popular woman's hairstyle is one inspired by the Roman Empress, Faustina I, with longer strands at the middle of the scalp drawn back into twists or plaits that were then wound into a tutulus at the crown of the head. Central-parted hair-knots at the back of the neck were common later in the same period. Empress Julia Domna popularized fluffy waved hair. Straight hair was common in the same period while later plaits on the crown of the head were rarely present.

=== Clothing ===
Other than representations of their wealth and social status, the subject's clothing suggests their previous roles in their local communities. For instance, men depicted to show their bare upper torso were usually athletes. The most common attire is a cloak worn over a chiton. It is common to have a traditionally Roman decorative line, clavus (plural clavi), on the subject's clothing. Most of the decorative lines are dark colored. While painted mummy portraits are shown to bear the traditional Roman decorative lines, not a single portrait has been definitely shown to depict the toga. It should, however, be kept in mind that Greek cloaks and togas are draped very similarly on depictions of the 1st and early 2nd centuries. In the late 2nd and 3rd centuries, togas should be distinguishable, but fail to occur.

=== Jewelry ===
Apart from the gold wreaths worn by many men, with very few exceptions, only women are depicted with jewellery. This generally accords with the common jewellery types of the Graeco-Roman East. Especially the Antinoopolis portraits depict simple gold link chains and massive gold rings. There are also depictions of precious or semi-precious stones like emerald, carnelian, garnet, agate or amethyst, rarely also of pearls. The stones were normally ground into cylindrical or spherical beads. Some portraits depict elaborate colliers, with precious stones set in gold.

The gold wreath was apparently rarely, if ever, worn in life, but a number have been found in graves from much earlier periods. Based on the plant wreaths given as prizes in contests, the idea was apparently to celebrate the achievements of the deceased in life.

There are three basic shapes of ear ornaments: Especially common in the 1st century are circular or drop-shaped pendants. Archaeological finds indicate that these were fully or semi-spherical. Later tastes favoured S-shaped hooks of gold wire, on which up to five beads of different colours and materials could be strung. The third shape are elaborate pendants with a horizontal bar from which two or three, occasionally four, vertical rods are suspended, usually each decorated with a white bead or pearl at the bottom. Other common ornaments include gold hairpins, often decorated with pearls, fine diadems, and, especially at Antinoopolis, gold hairnets. Many portraits also depict amulets and pendants, perhaps with magical functions.

== Coexistence with other burial habits ==
The religious meaning of mummy portraits has not, so far, been fully explained, nor have associated grave rites. There is some indication that it developed from genuine Egyptian funerary rites, adapted by a multi-cultural ruling class. The tradition of mummy portraits occurred from the Delta to Nubia, but it is striking that other funerary habits prevailed over portrait mummies at all sites except those in the Faiyum (and there especially Hawara and Achmim) and Antinoopolis. In most sites, different forms of burial coexisted. The choice of grave type may have been determined to a large extent by the financial means and status of the deceased, modified by local customs. Portrait mummies have been found both in rock-cut tombs and in freestanding built grave complexes, but also in shallow pits. It is striking that they are virtually never accompanied by any grave offerings, with the exception of occasional pots or sprays of flowers.

== End of the mummy portrait tradition ==
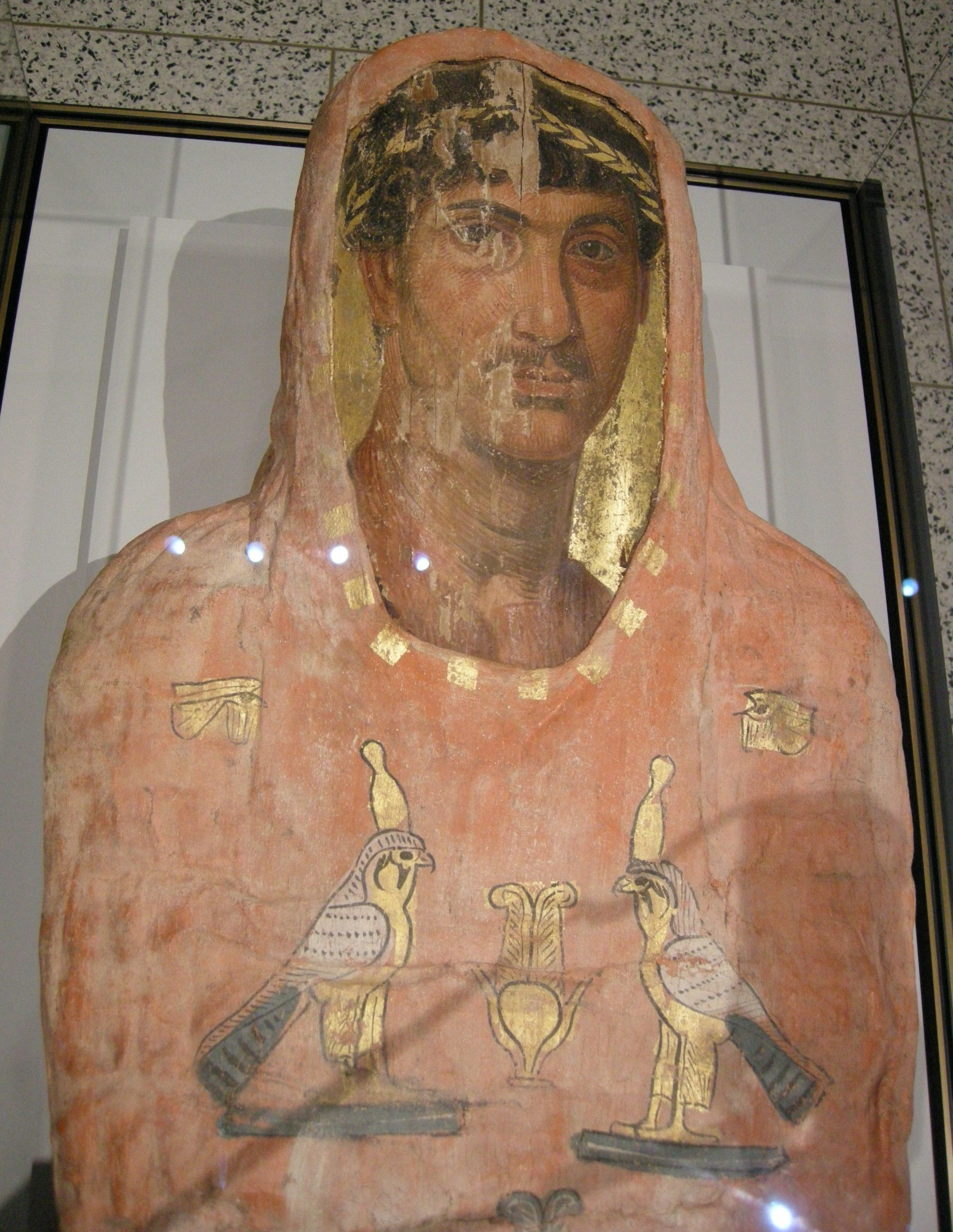
Fayum mummy portrait of a man named Herakleides, 50–100 AD, Getty Villa

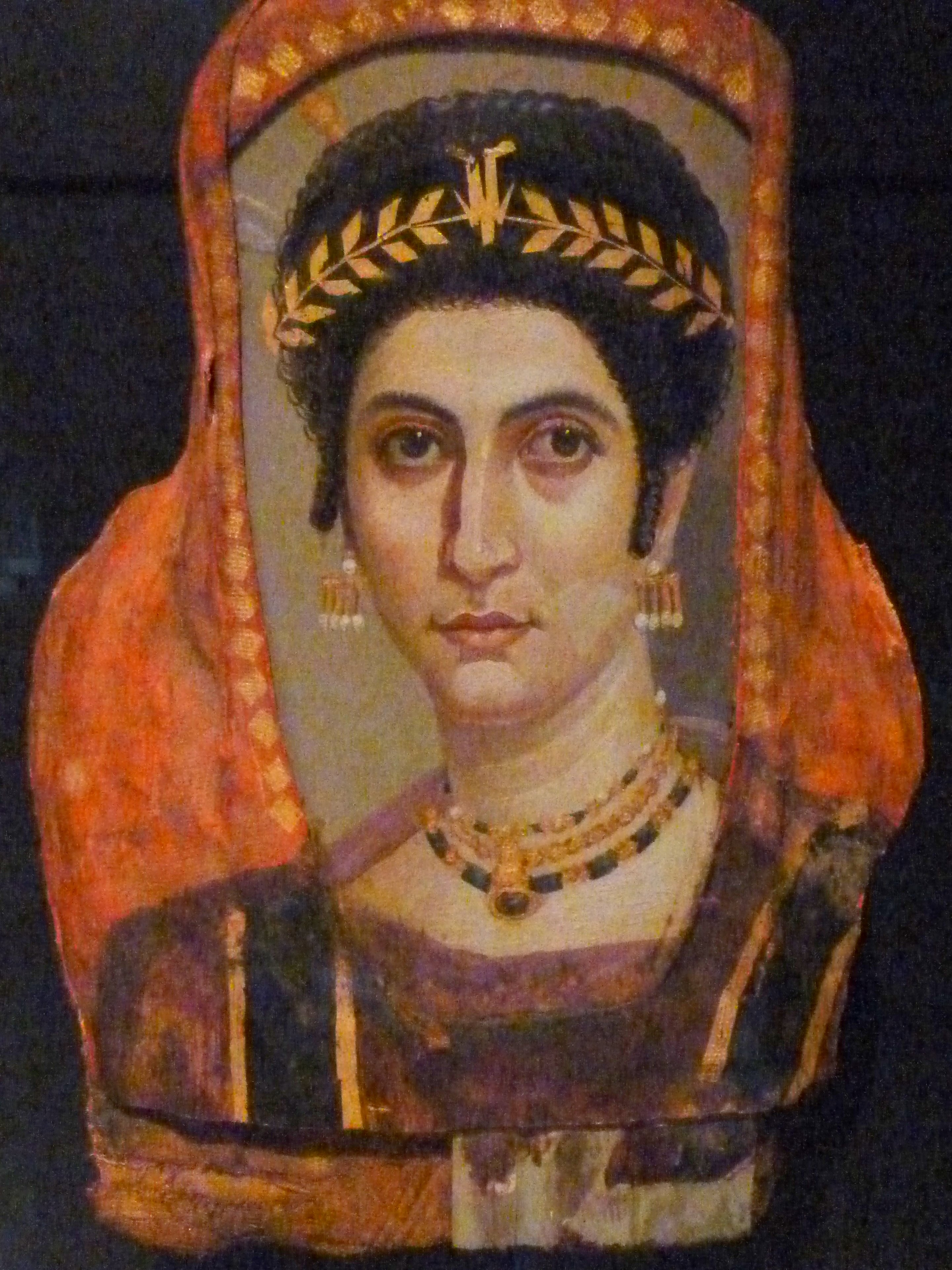
Portrait of a woman named Isidora from Ankyronpolis, 100–110 AD, Getty Villa

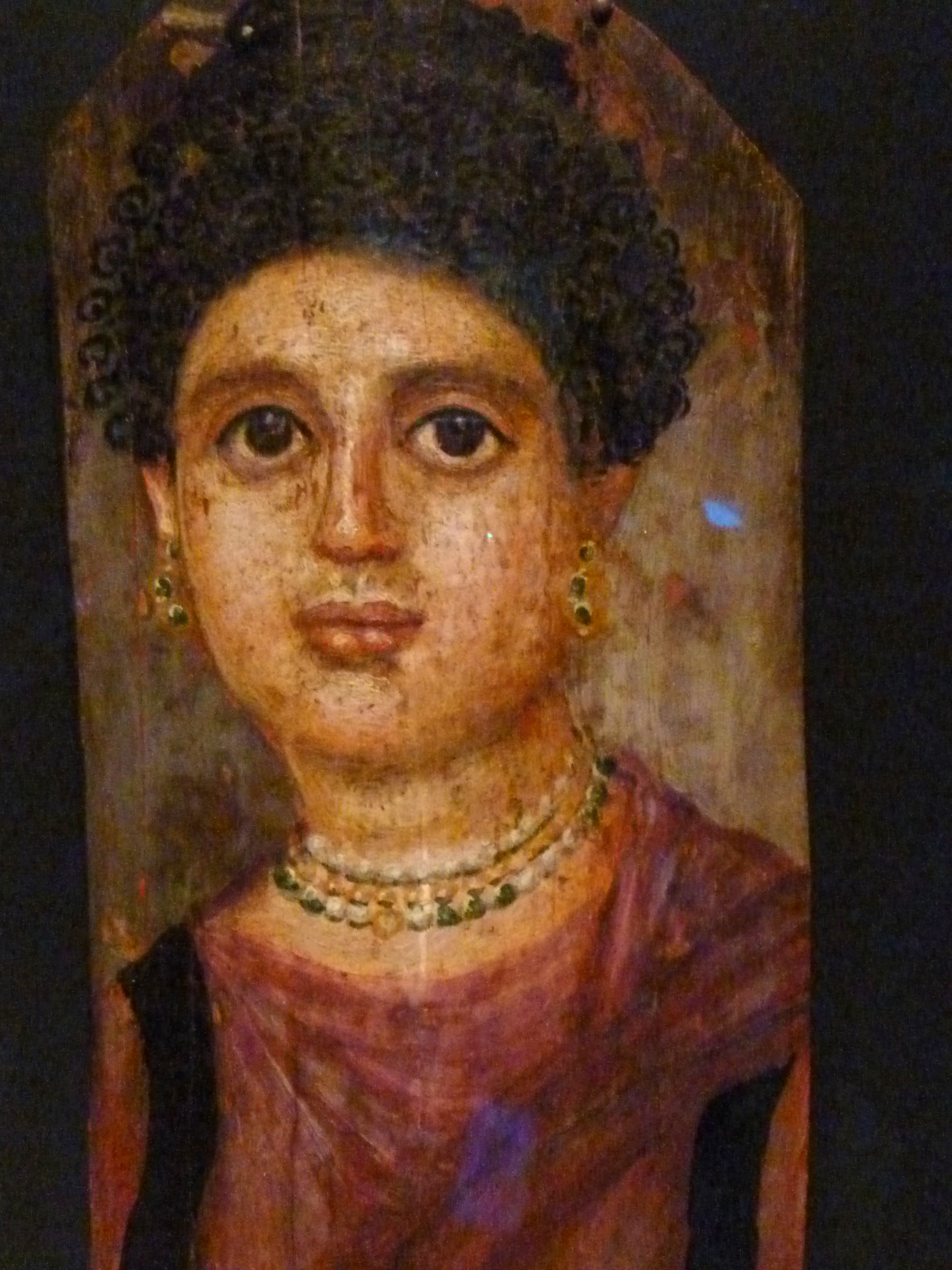
Fayum portrait of a woman from Hawara, 75–100 AD, Getty Villa

For a long time, it was assumed that the latest portraits belong to the end of the 4th century, but recent research has modified this view considerably, suggesting that the last wooden portraits belong to the middle, the last directly painted mummy wrappings to the second half of the 3rd century. It is commonly accepted that production reduced considerably since the beginning of the 3rd century. Several reasons for the decline of the mummy portrait have been suggested; no single reason should probably be isolated, rather, they should be seen as operating together.

- In the 3rd century the Roman Empire underwent a severe economic crisis, severely limiting the financial abilities of the upper classes. Although they continued to lavishly spend money on representation, they favoured public appearances, like games and festivals, over the production of portraits. However, other elements of sepulchral representation, like sarcophagi, did continue.
- There is evidence of a religious crisis at the same time. This may not be as closely connected with the rise of Christianity as previously assumed. (The earlier suggestion of a 4th-century end to the portraits would coincide with the widespread distribution of Christianity in Egypt. Christianity also never banned mummification.) An increasing neglect of Egyptian temples is noticeable during the Roman imperial period, leading to a general drop in interest in all ancient religions.
- The Constitutio Antoniniana, i.e. the granting of Roman citizenship to all free subjects changed the social structures of Egypt. For the first time, the individual cities gained a degree of self-administration. At the same time, the provincial upper classes changed in terms of both composition and inter-relations.

Thus, a combination of several factors appears to have led to changes of fashion and ritual. No clear causality can be asserted.

Considering the limited nature of the current understanding of portrait mummies, it remains distinctly possible that future research will considerably modify the image presented here. For example, some scholars suspect that the centre of production of such finds, and thus the centre of the distinctive funerary tradition they represent, may have been located at Alexandria. New finds from Marina el-Alamein strongly support such a view. In view of the near-total loss of Greek and Roman paintings, mummy portraits are today considered to be among the very rare examples of ancient art that can be seen to reflect "Great paintings" and especially Roman portrait painting.

== Art-historical significance ==
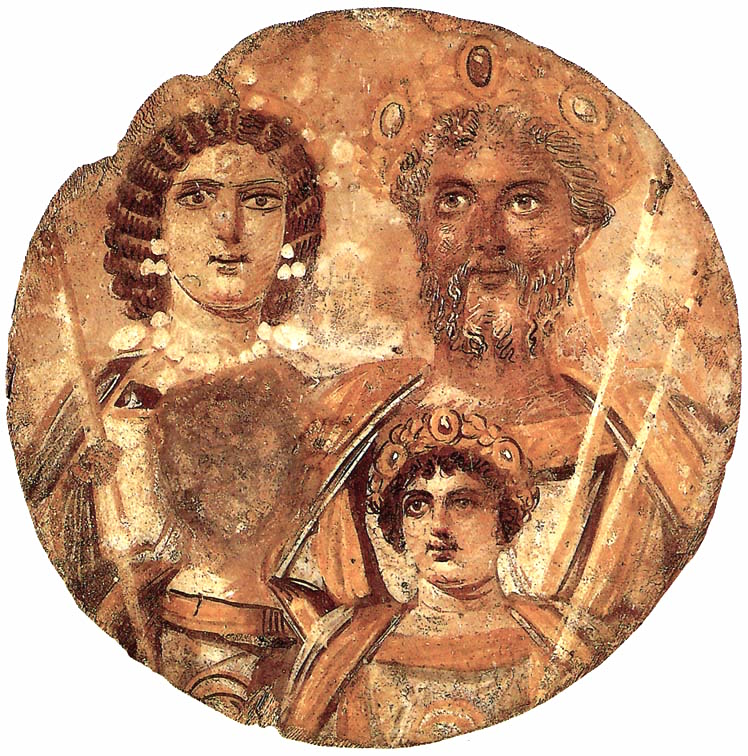
Severan Tondo with images of Septimius Severus and his family. Antikensammlung Berlin.

The mummy portraits have immense art-historical importance. Ancient sources indicate that panel painting rather than wall painting (i.e., painting on wood or other mobile surfaces) was held in high regard, but very few ancient panel paintings survive. One of the few examples besides the mummy portraits is the Severan Tondo, also from Egypt (200 AD), which, like the mummy portraits, is believed to represent a provincial version of contemporary style. (Note: Other examples: a framed portrait from Hawara, the image of a man flanked by two deities from the same site, or the 6th century BC panels from Pitsa in Greece.)

Some aspects of the mummy portraits, especially their frontal perspective and their concentration on key facial features, strongly resemble later icon painting. A direct link has been suggested, but it should be kept in mind that the mummy portraits represent only a small part of a much wider Graeco-Roman tradition, the whole of which later bore an influence on the art of late antiquity and Byzantine art. A pair of panel "icons" of Serapis and Isis of comparable date (3rd century) and style are in the Getty Museum at Malibu; as with the cult of Mithras, earlier examples of cult images were sculptures or pottery figurines, but from the 3rd century reliefs and then painted images are found.

== History of research ==
=== Pre-19th century ===
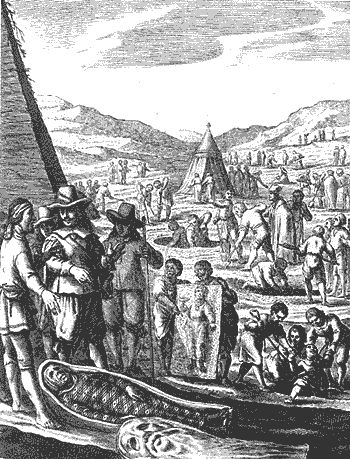
1681 engraving of the mummies' discovery by Pietro Della Valle. Della Valle found the first two Fayum portraits in 1615 and brought them back to Italy.

The Italian explorer Pietro Della Valle, on a visit to Saqqara-Memphis in 1615, was the first European to discover and describe mummy portraits. He was conducting excavations when a merchant came to his tent one night and claimed to have a mummy to sell, but that it had to remain a secret from the other locals. Della Valle described the discovery in his 1650 travelogue:

"They made us walk over a mile or two, and it seemed to me we were travelling very far to find what he, pointing with his finger, kept saying was 'just here, just here,' and 'very close.' Finally we arrived at a spot where, near to an excavated well that they said had been discovered by him two or three days before, he drew forth a mummy from some sand under which he had it hidden: the entire body of a dead man which, being for the most part well preserved and most curiously adorned and neat, seemed to me very beautiful and elegant. It could be seen to be a large naked man, though he was tightly bound and wrapped in a great quantity of linen cloths ... These cloth bindings and bundles immediately brought to my mind the story of the raising of Lazarus who obviously appeared like this. ... What is of interest is that on the top part of the body, flattened like the lid of a chest from so much binding, was painted the effigy of a youthful man, and from head to foot his garment was adorned with so many bits and pieces of pictures and gold, with so many hieroglyphics and characters and similar fanciful decorations, that, believe me, it was the most graceful thing imaginable."

— Pietro Della Valle, Viaggi di Pietro Della Valle, il Pellegrino

Della Valle purchased the mummy from the man, along with the mummy of a woman found in the same well, for a total of six piastres. He transported them to Europe and they are now both in the Albertinum (Staatliche Kunstsammlungen Dresden).

=== 19th-century collectors ===
Although interest in ancient Egypt steadily increased after that period, further finds of mummy portraits did not become known before the early 19th century. The provenance of these first new finds is unclear; they may come from Saqqara as well, or perhaps from Thebes. In 1820, the Baron of Minotuli acquired several mummy portraits for a German collector, but they became part of a whole shipload of Egyptian artifacts lost in the North Sea. In 1827, Léon de Laborde brought two portraits, supposedly found in Memphis, to Europe, one of which can today be seen at the Louvre, the other in the British Museum. Ippolito Rosellini, a member of Jean-François Champollion's 1828–29 expedition to Egypt, brought a further portrait back to Florence. It is so similar to de Laborde's specimens that it is thought to be from the same source. During the 1820s, the British Consul General to Egypt, Henry Salt, sent several further portraits to Paris and London. Some of them were long considered portraits of the family of the Theban Archon Pollios Soter, a historical character known from written sources, but this has turned out to be incorrect.

Once again, a long period elapsed before more mummy portraits came to light. In 1887, Daniel Marie Fouquet heard of the discovery of numerous portrait mummies in a cave. He set off to inspect them some days later, but arrived too late, as the finders had used the painted plaques for firewood during the three previous cold desert nights. Fouquet acquired the remaining two of what had originally been fifty portraits. While the exact location of this find is unclear, the likely source is from er-Rubayat. At that location, not long after Fouquet's visit, the Viennese art trader Theodor Graf found several further images, which he tried to sell as profitably as possible. He engaged the famous Egyptologist Georg Ebers to publish his finds. He produced presentation folders to advertise his individual finds throughout Europe. Although little was known about their archaeological find contexts, Graf went as far as to ascribe the portraits to known Ptolemaic pharaohs by analogy with other works of art, mainly coin portraits. None of these associations were particularly well argued or convincing, but they gained him much attention, not least because he gained the support of well-known scholars like Rudolf Virchow. As a result, mummy portraits became the centre of much attention. By the late 19th century, their very specific aesthetic made them sought-after collection pieces, distributed by the global arts trade.

=== Archaeological study: Flinders Petrie ===
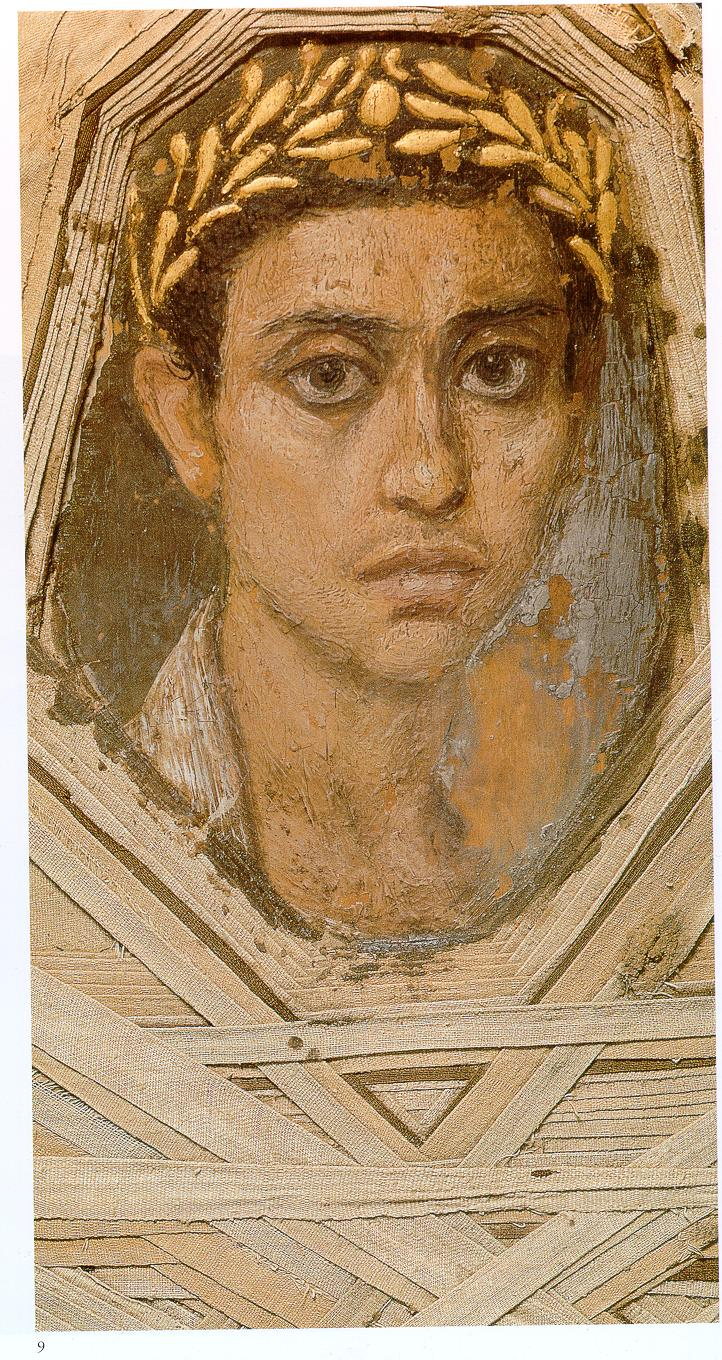
Detail of a portrait within its mummy wrappings, Metropolitan Museum of Art, discovered by Flinders Petrie in 1911.

In parallel, more scientific engagement with the portraits was beginning. In 1887, the British archaeologist Flinders Petrie started excavations at Hawara. He discovered a Roman necropolis which yielded 81 portrait mummies in the first year of excavation. At an exhibition in London, these portraits drew large crowds. In the following year, Petrie continued excavations at the same location but now suffered from the competition of a German and an Egyptian art dealer. Petrie returned in the winter of 1910–11 and excavated a further 70 portrait mummies, some of them quite badly preserved. With very few exceptions, Petrie's studies still provide the only examples of mummy portraits so far found as the result of systematic excavation and published properly. Although the published studies are not entirely up to modern standards, they remain the most important source for the find contexts of portrait mummies.

=== Late-19th- and early-20th-century collectors ===
In 1892, the German archaeologist von Kaufmann discovered the so-called "Tomb of Aline", which held three mummy portraits; among the most famous today. Other important sources of such finds are at Antinoöpolis and Akhmim. The French archaeologist Albert Gayet worked at Antinoöpolis and found much relevant material, but his work, like that of many of his contemporaries, does not satisfy modern standards. His documentation is incomplete, many of his finds remain without context.

=== Museums and Provenance ===
Museums and collections around the world possess more than 700 portraits. Around 130 portraits are located in North America and held at leading institutions such as the J. Paul Getty Museum in Los Angeles and the Metropolitan Museum of Art in New York. The known provenance of a large number the portraits falls short due to poorly documented archaeological reports and excavation data; which highlights a common difficulty in research. However, an exception of this was the work of Petrie at Hawara which enlisted excellent written records but which only counts for a small portion of portraits among the hundreds found.

== Gallery ==
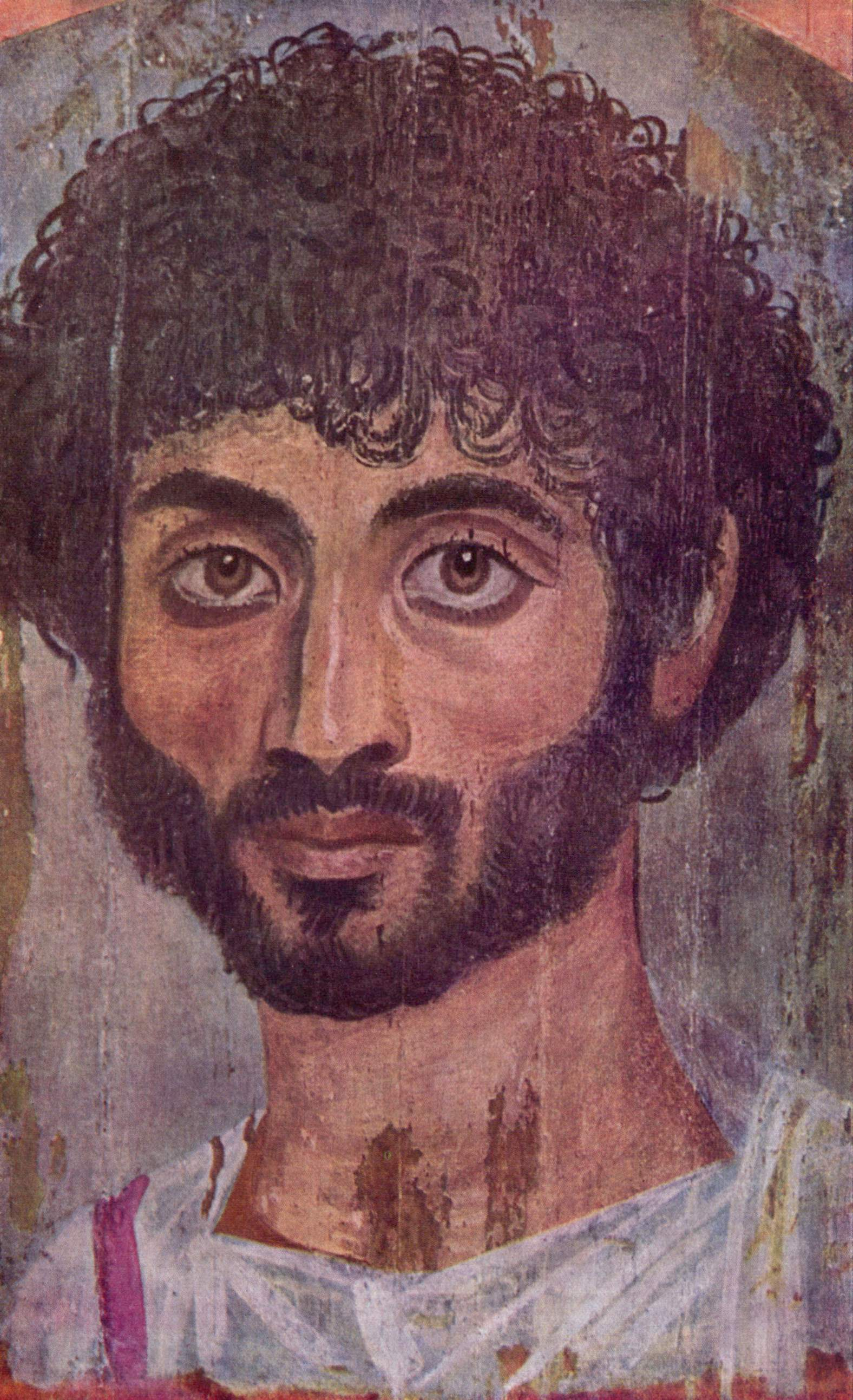

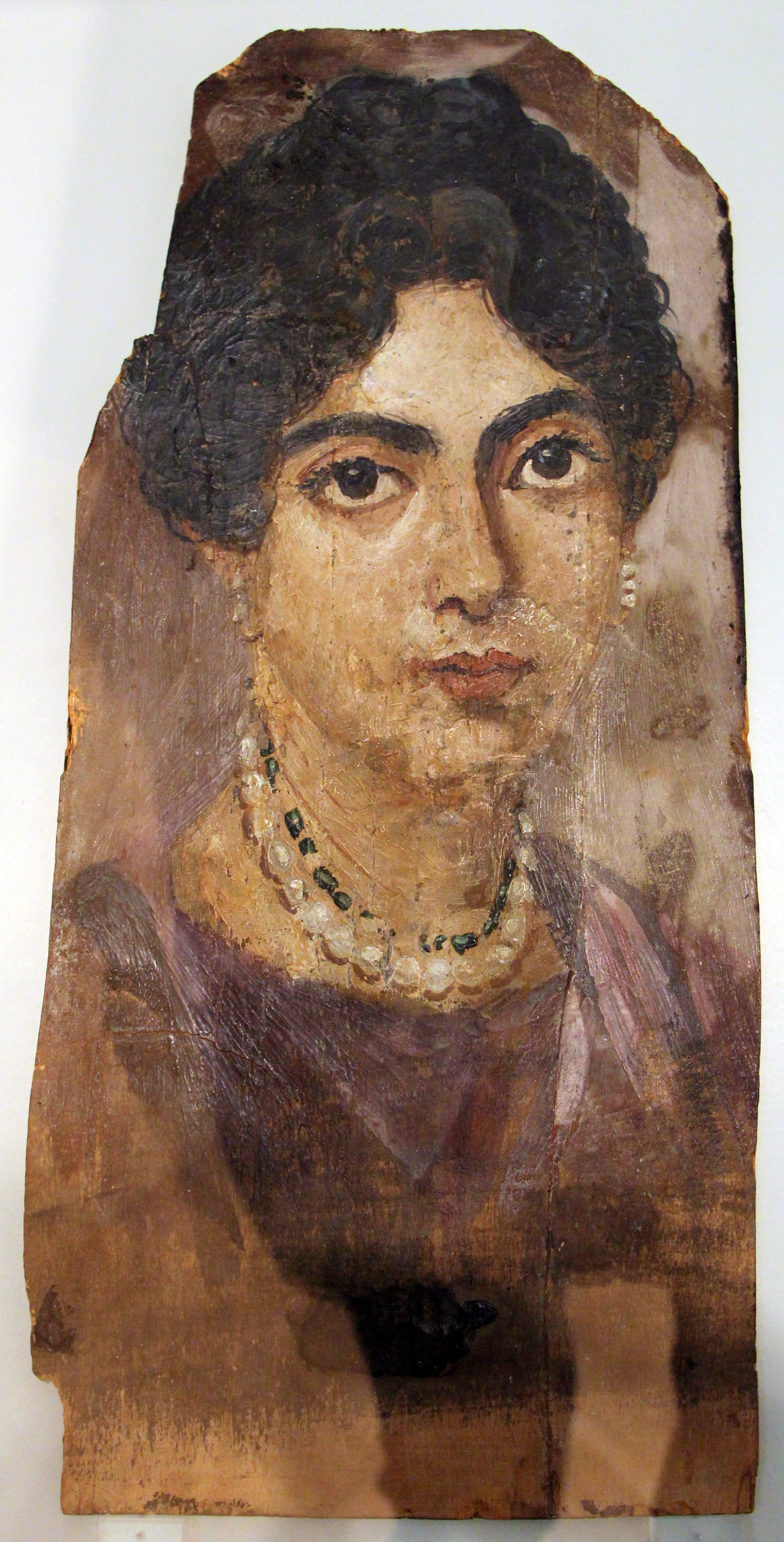

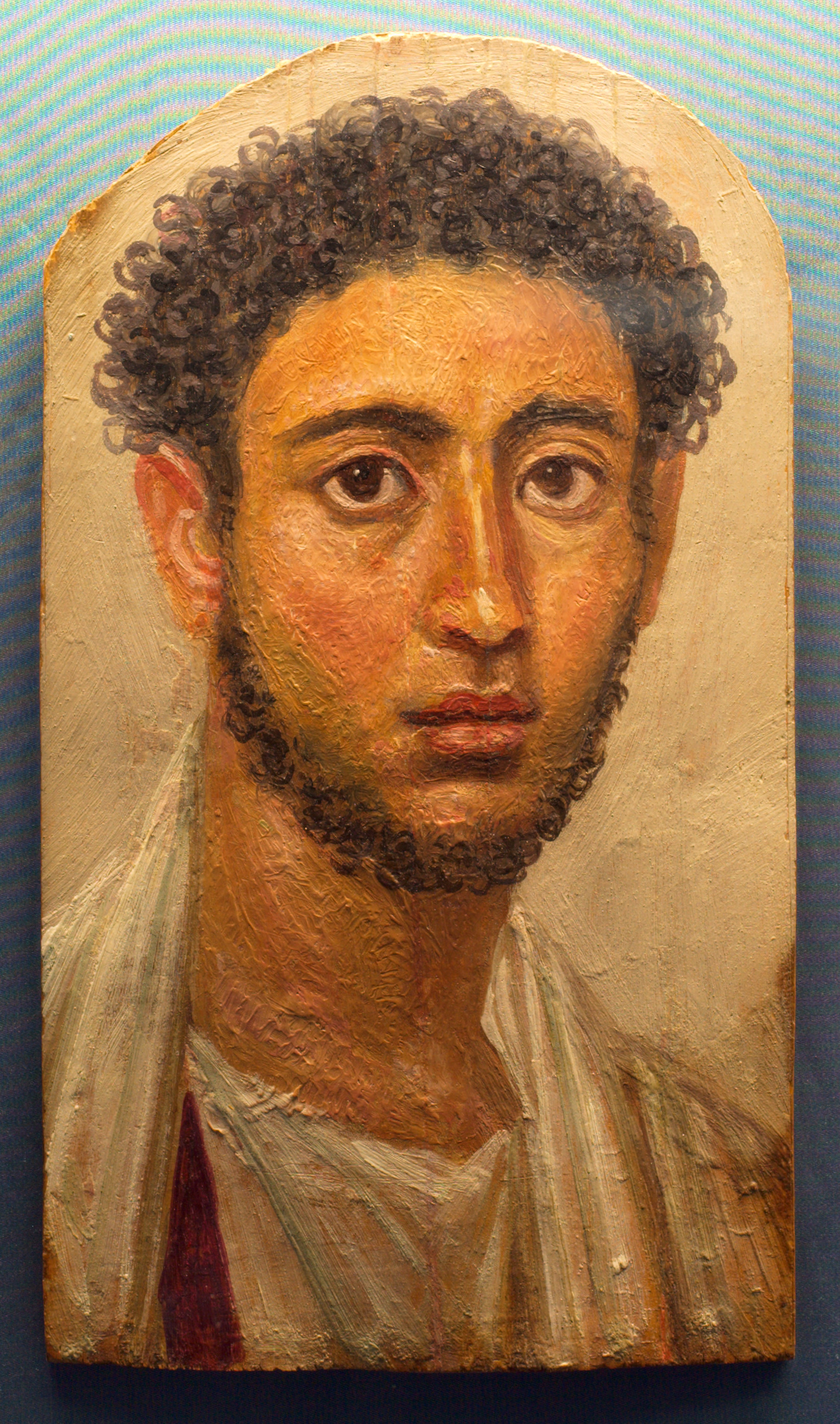

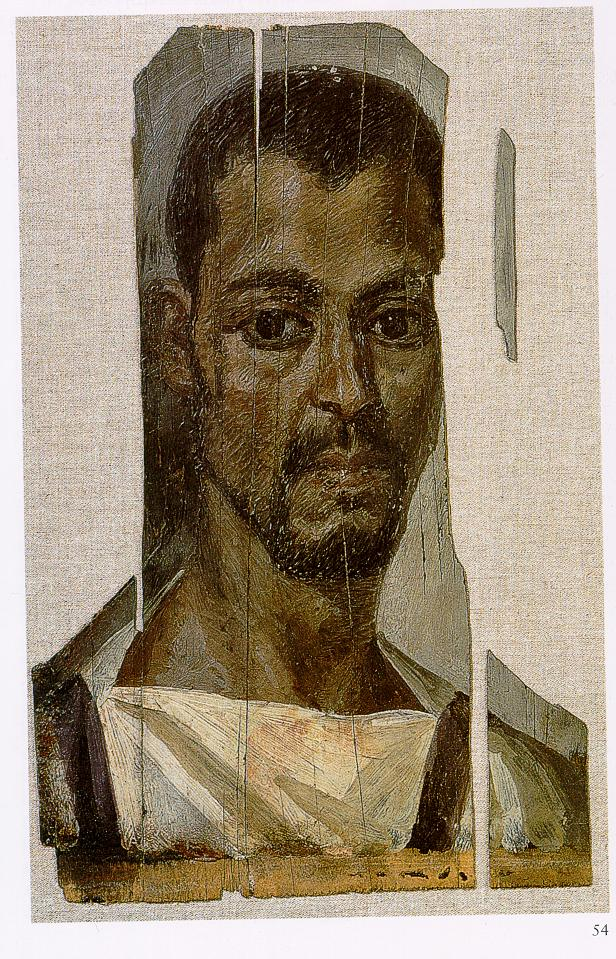

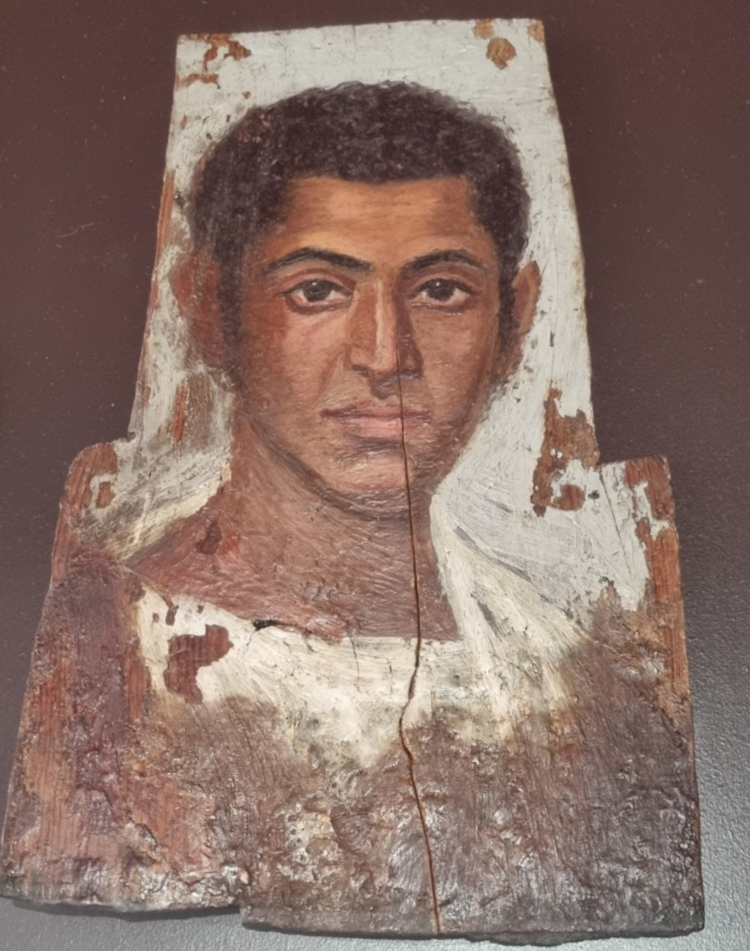

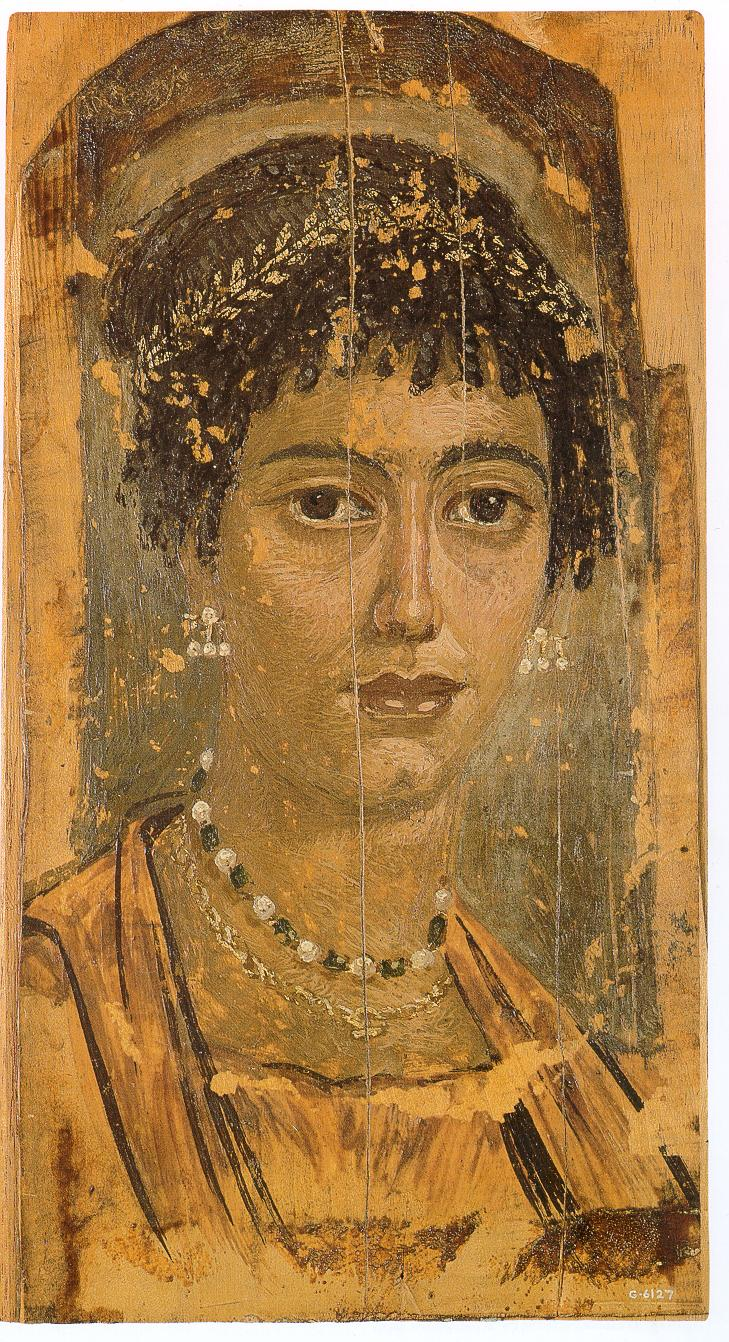

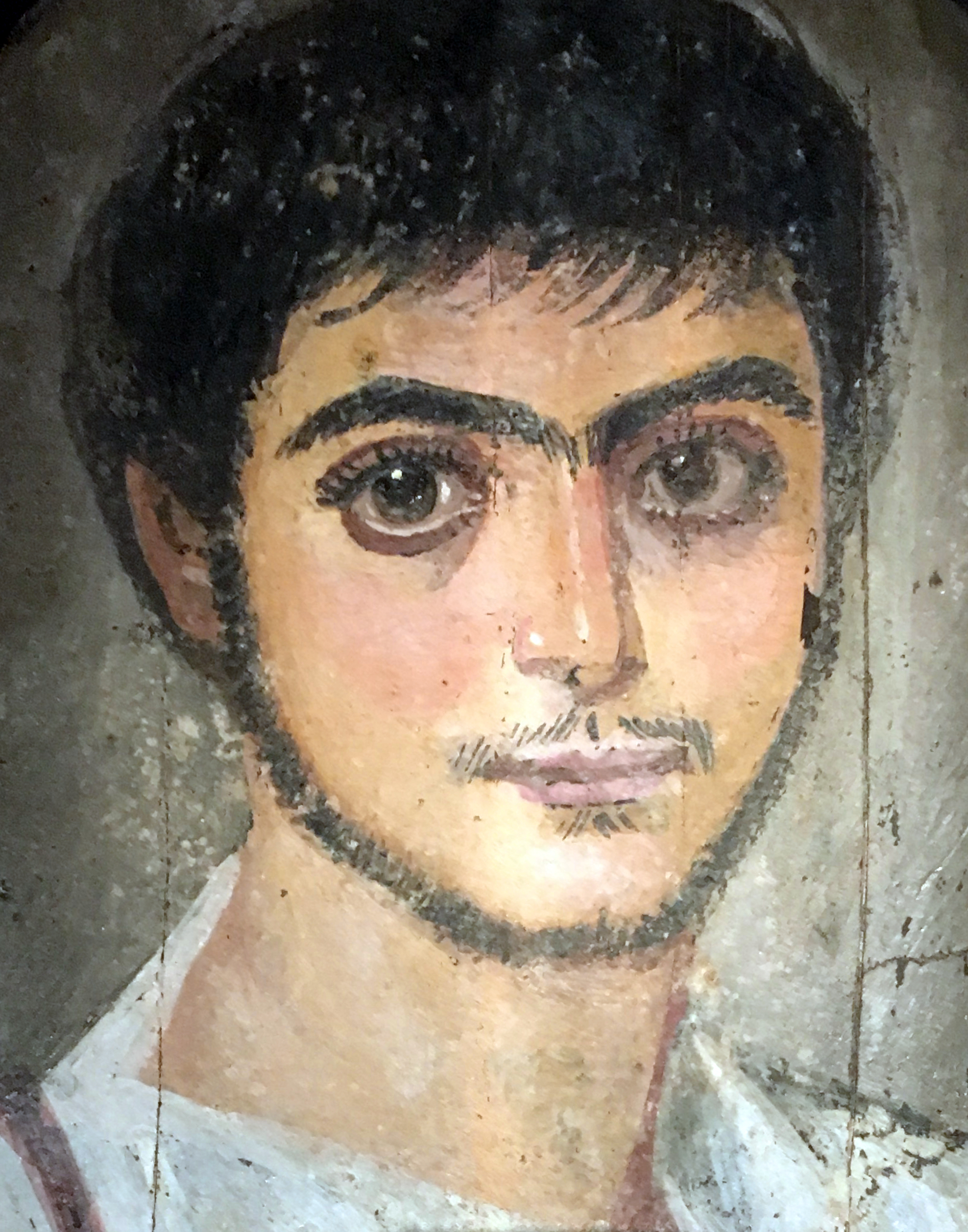

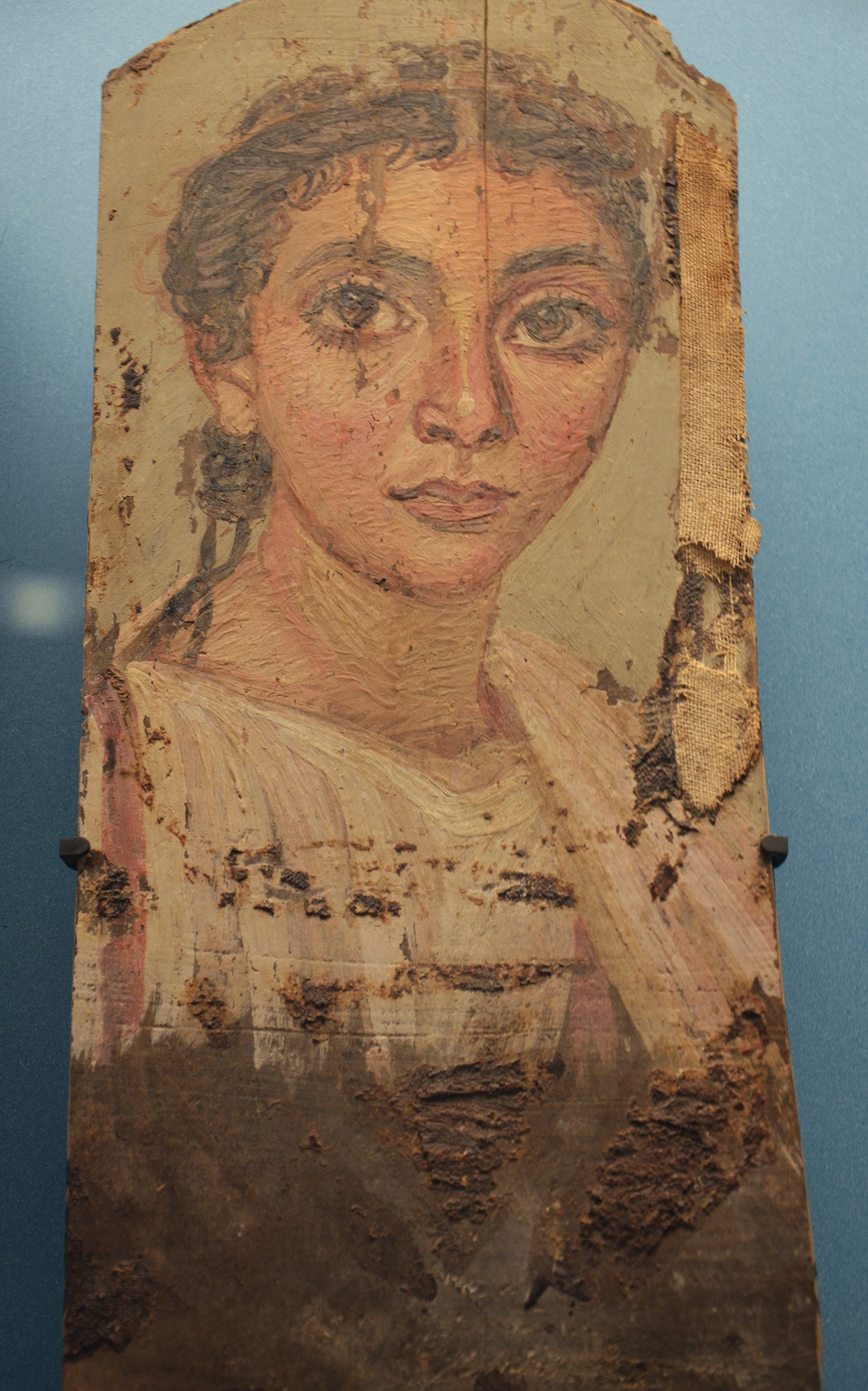

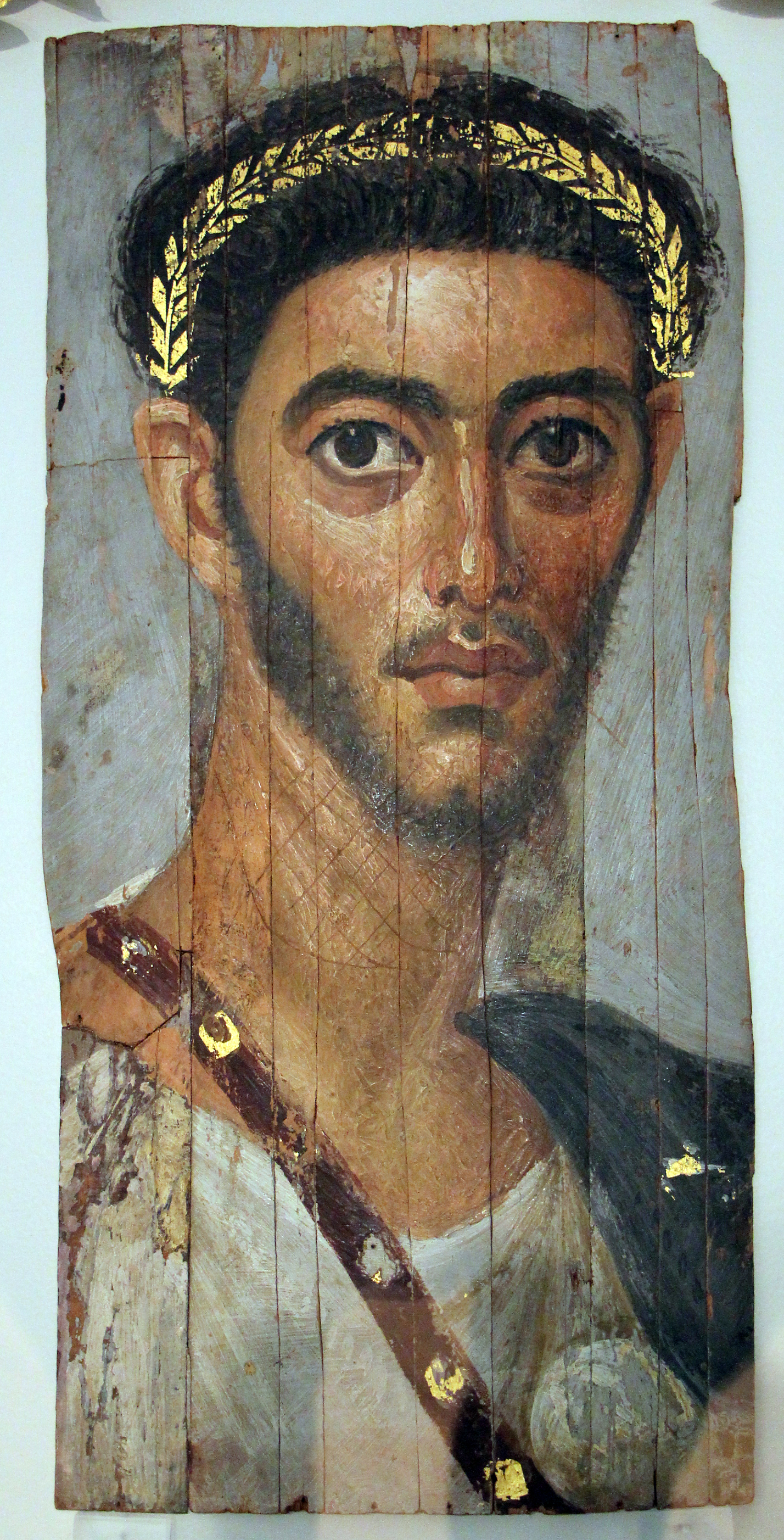

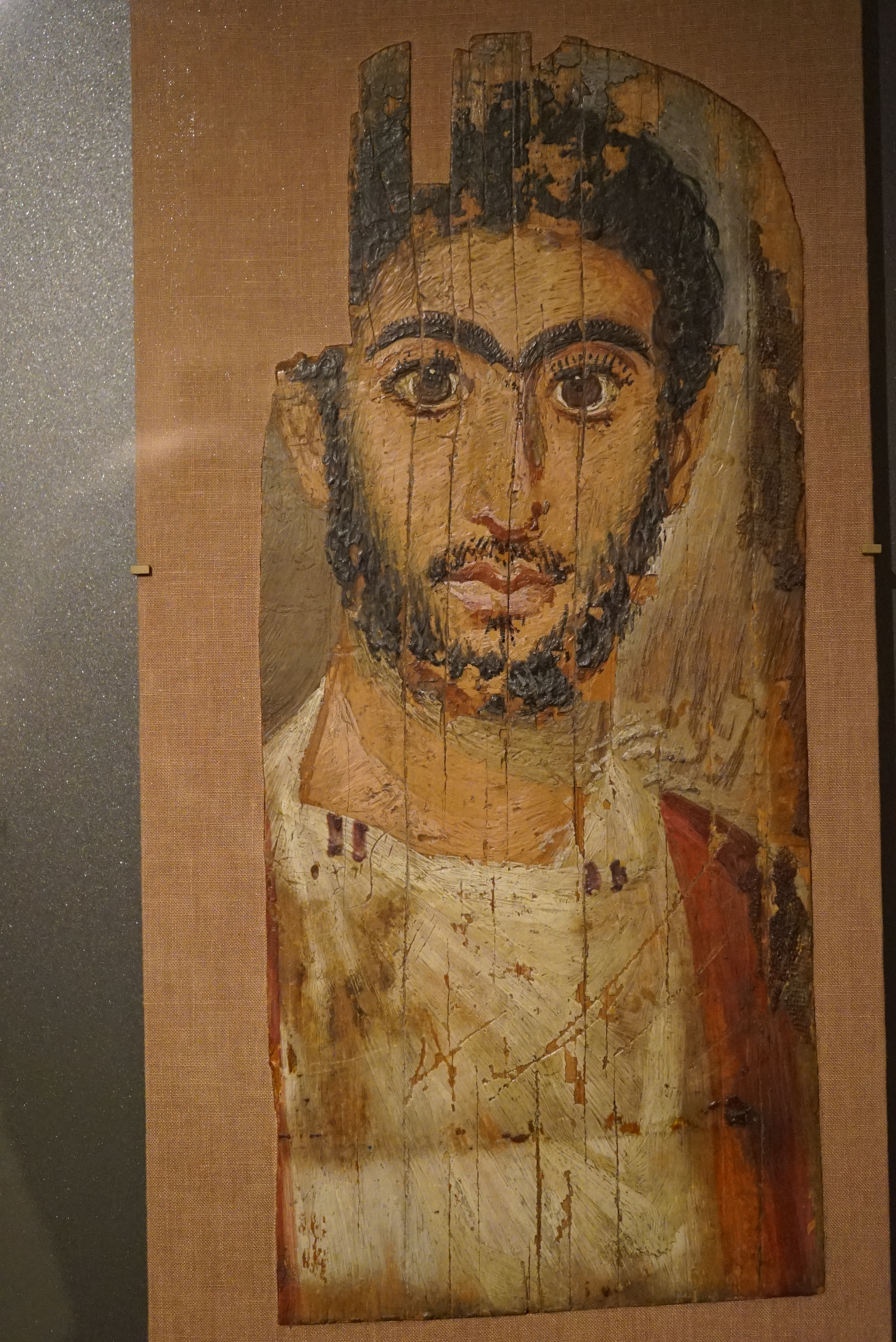

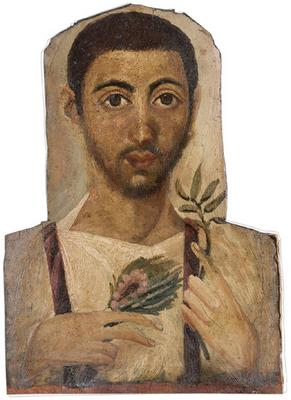

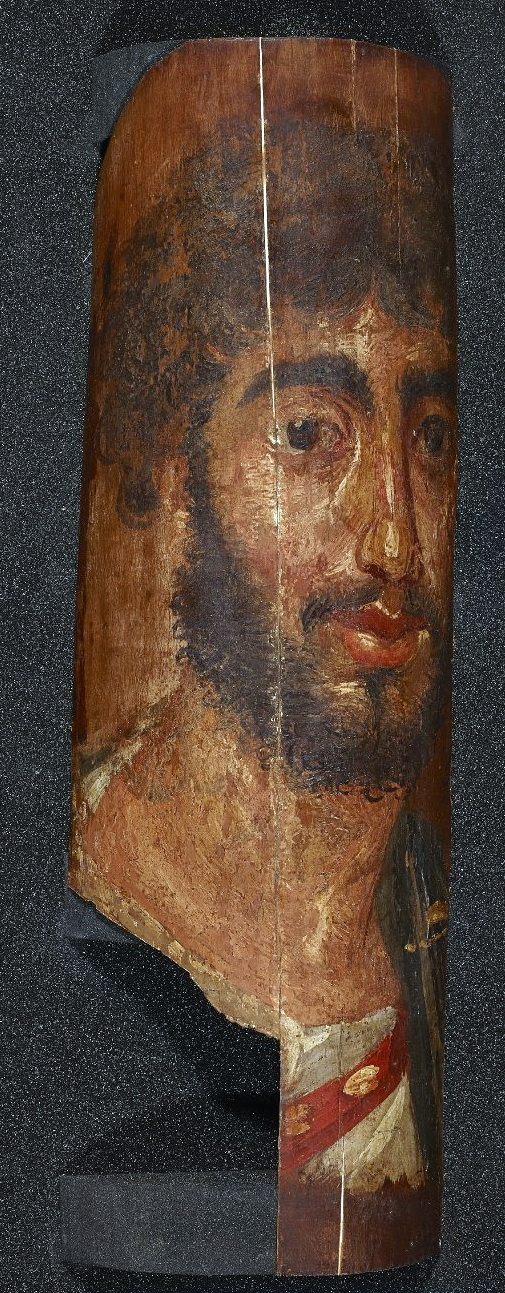

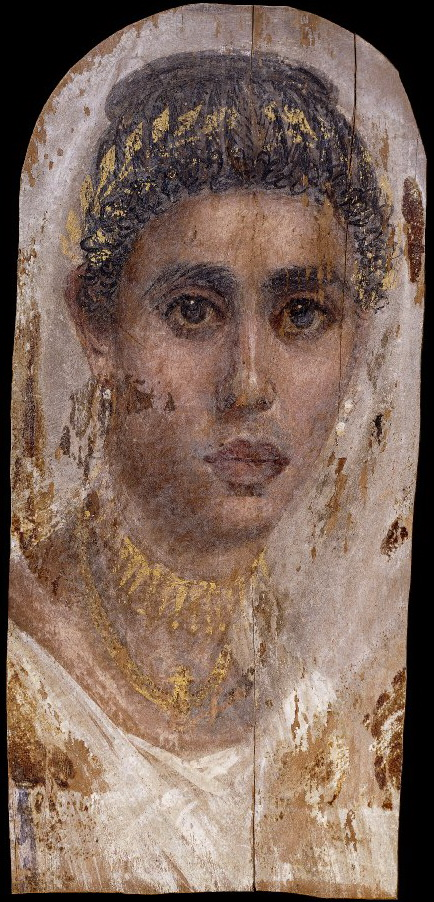

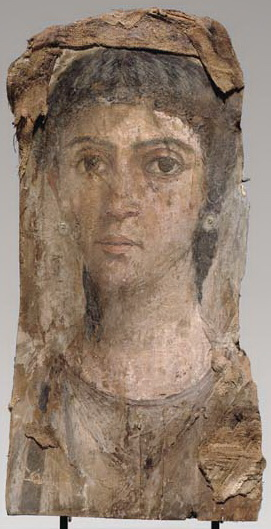

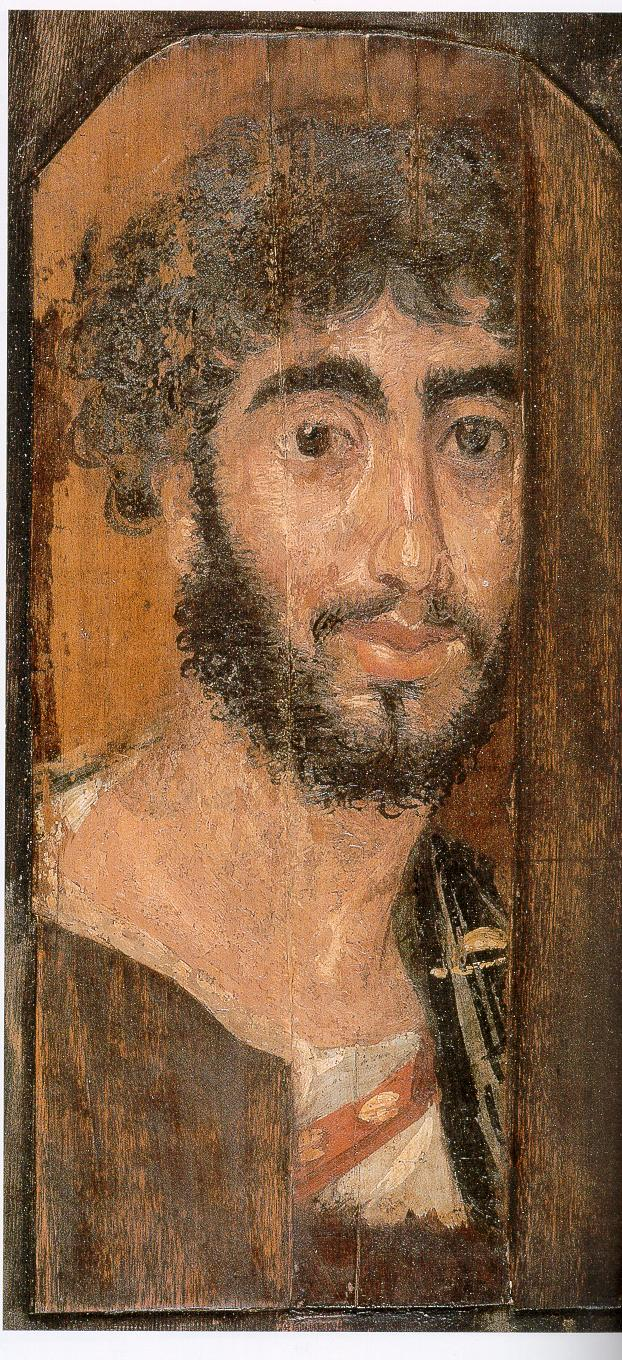

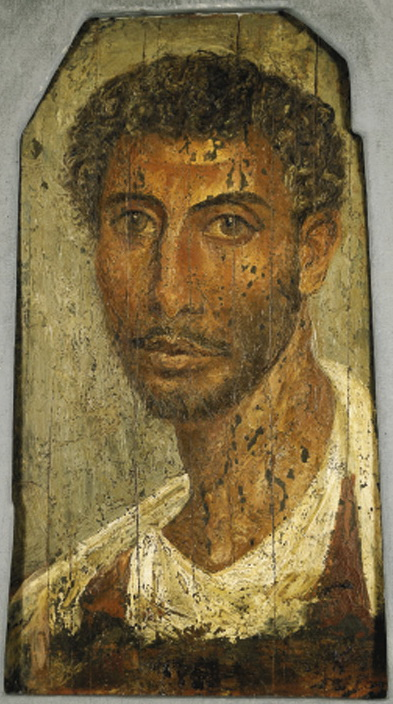

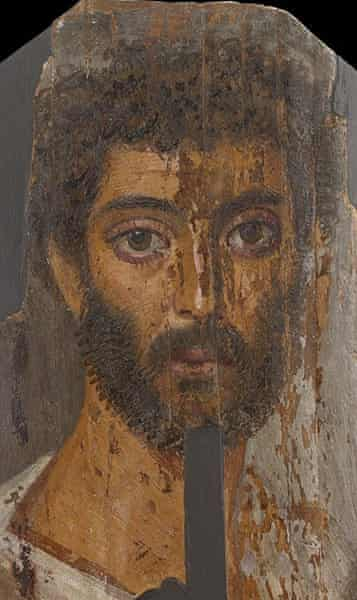

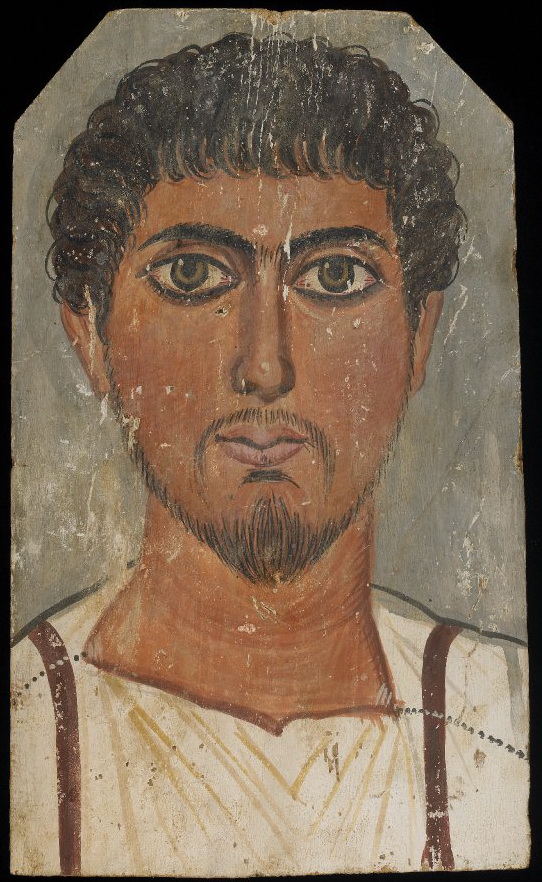

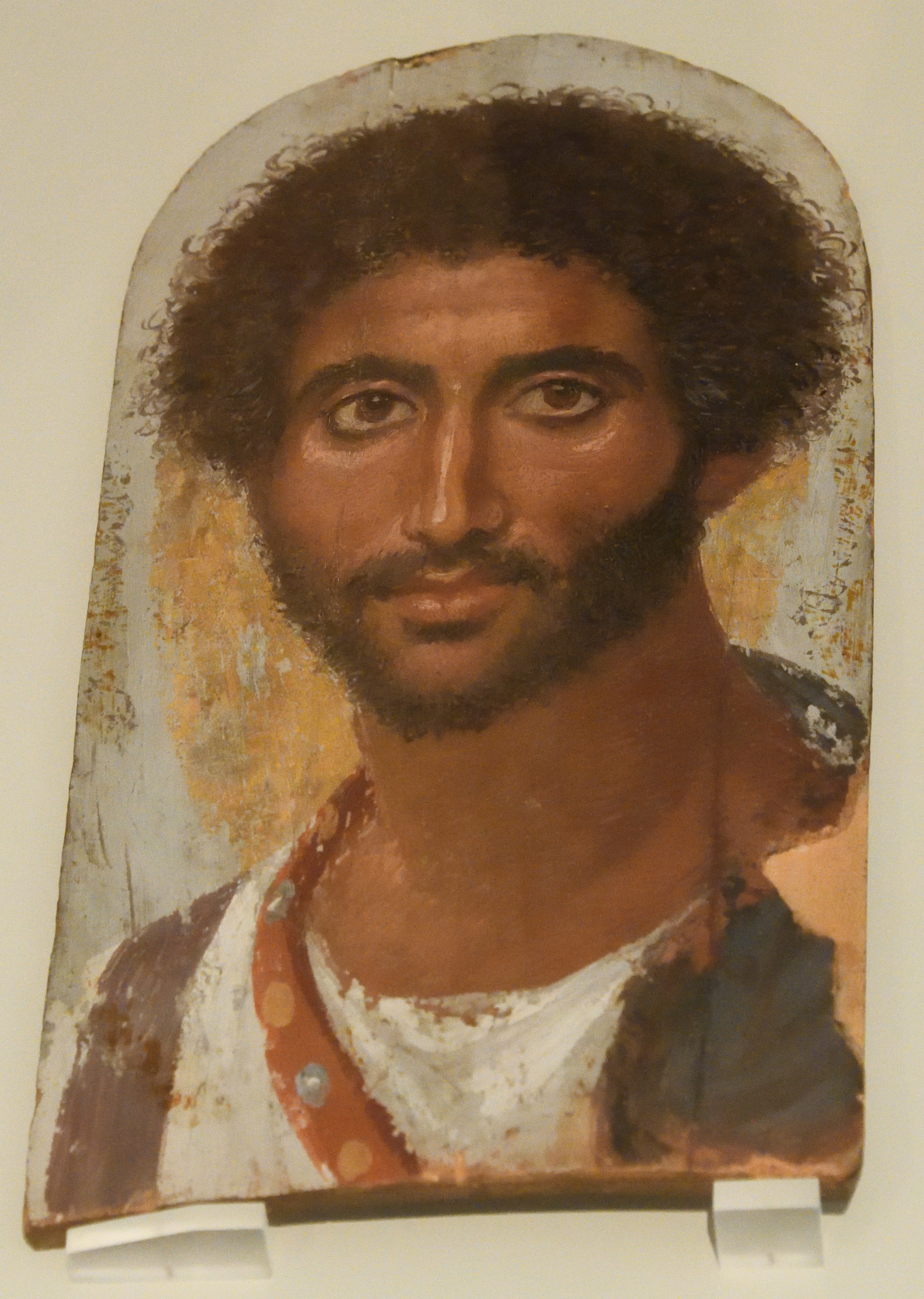

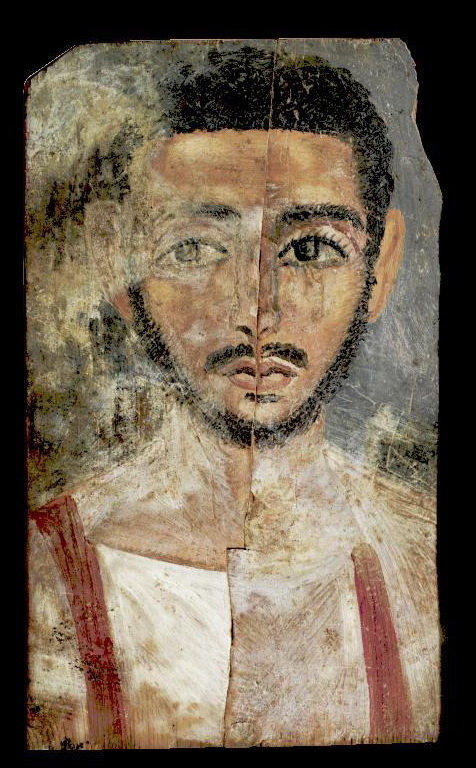

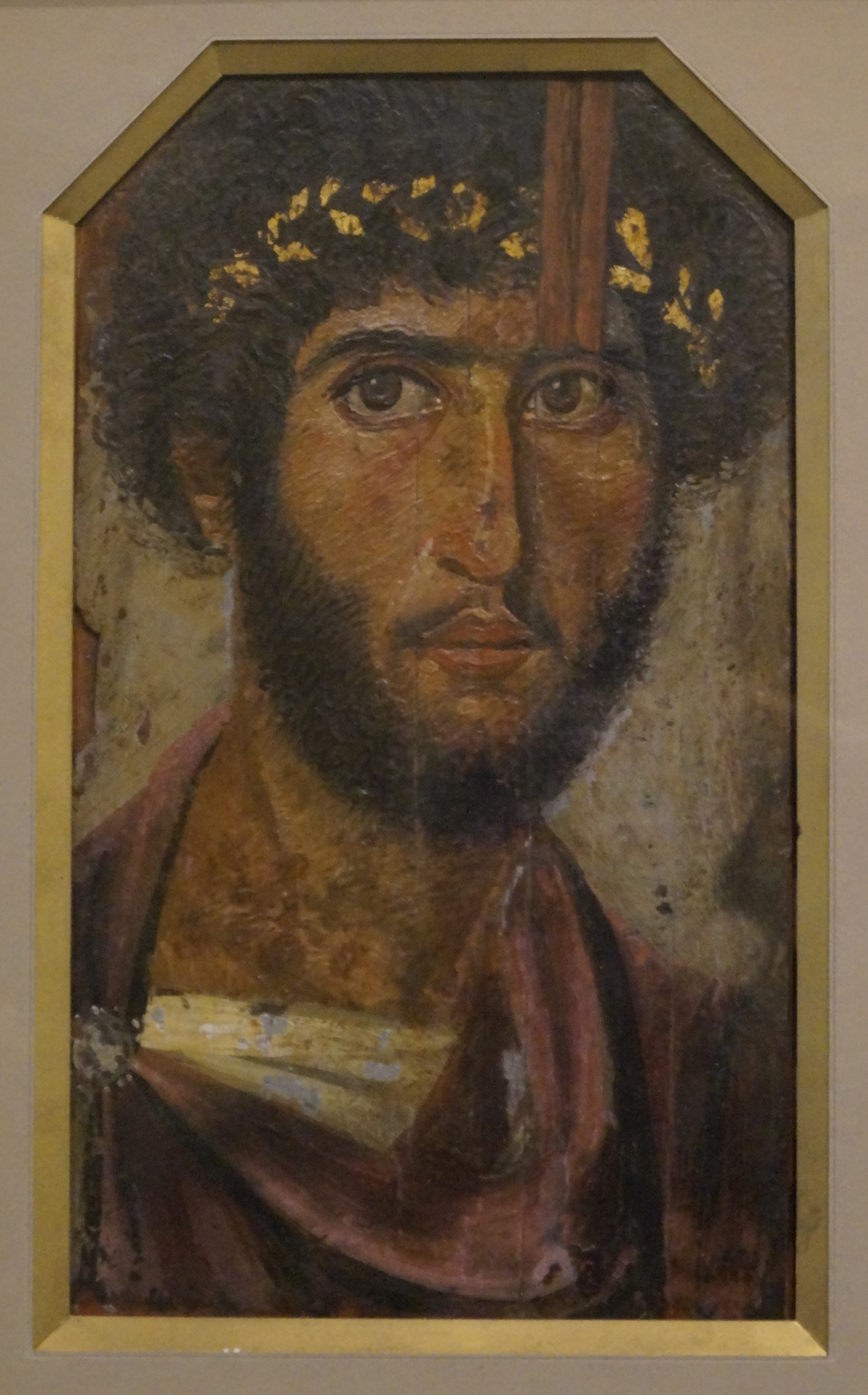

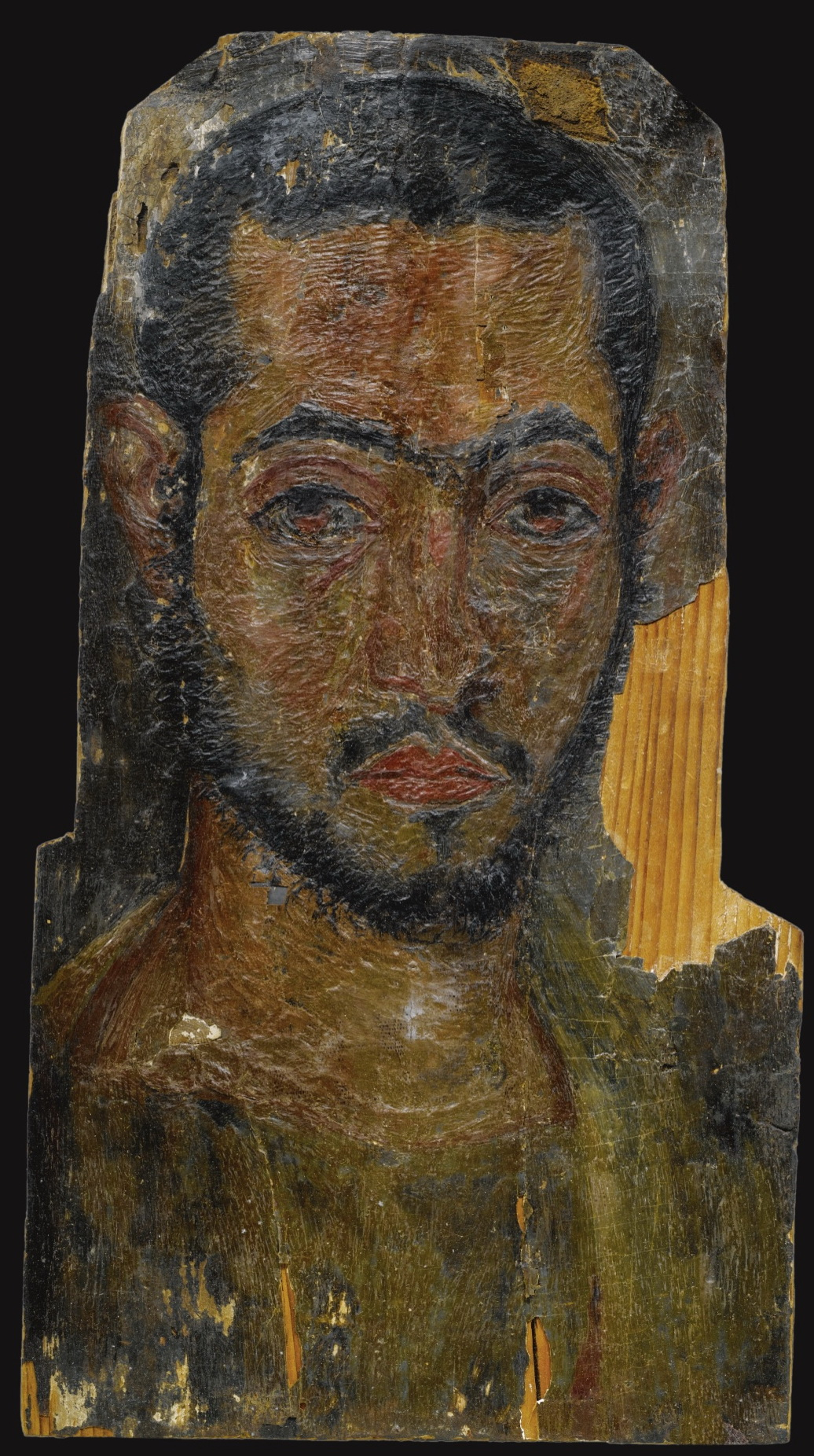

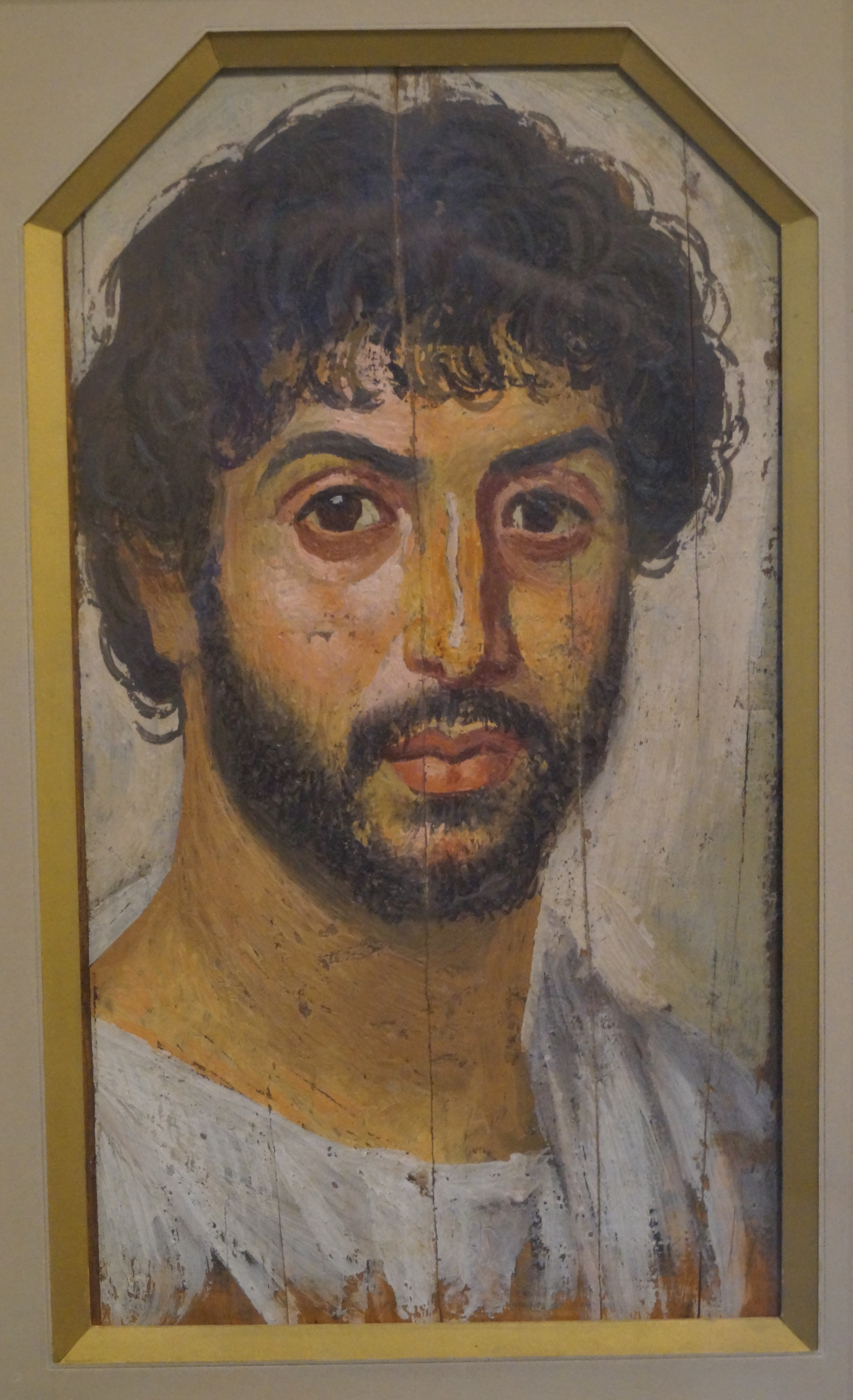

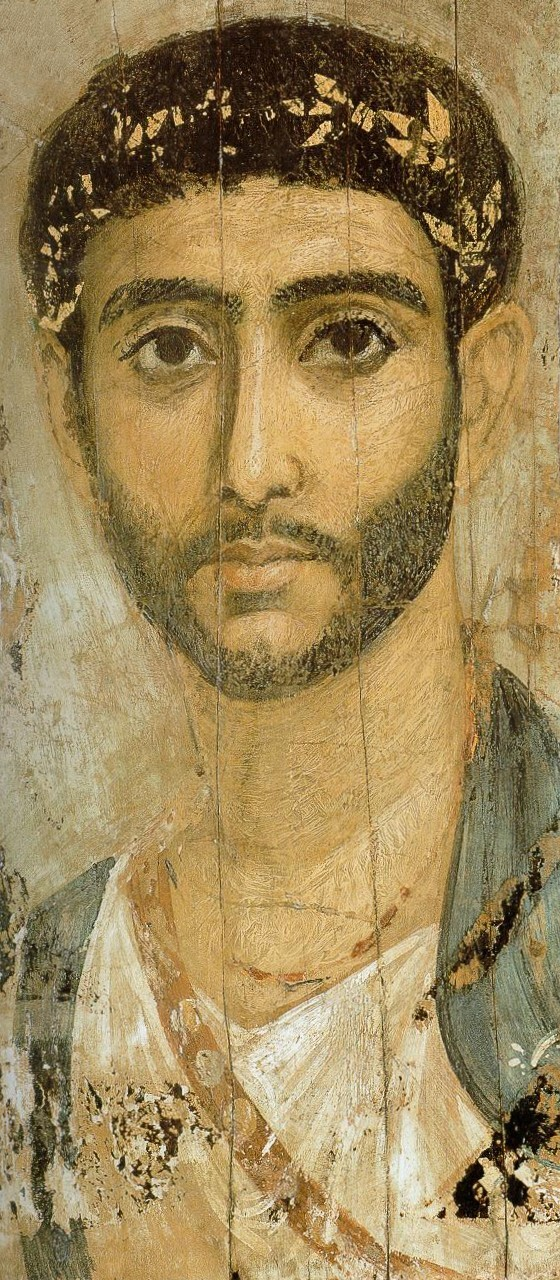

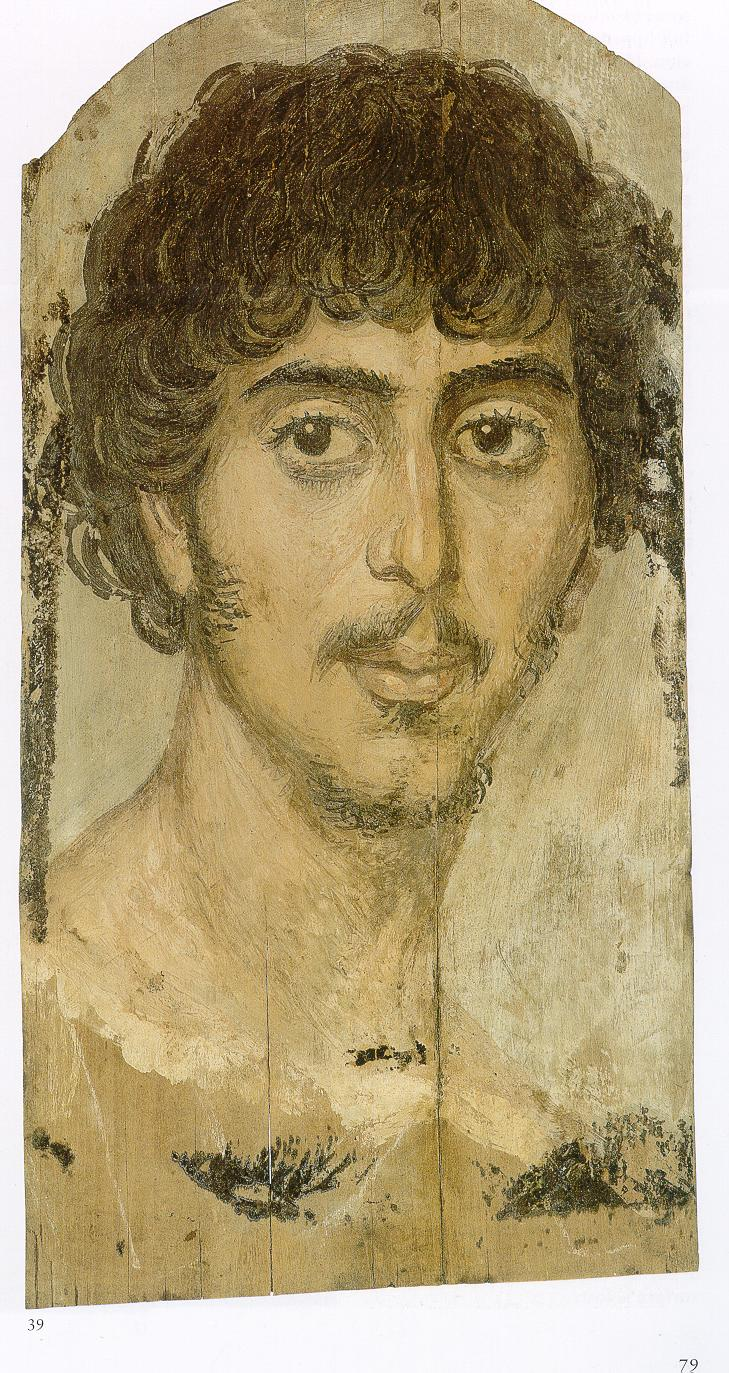

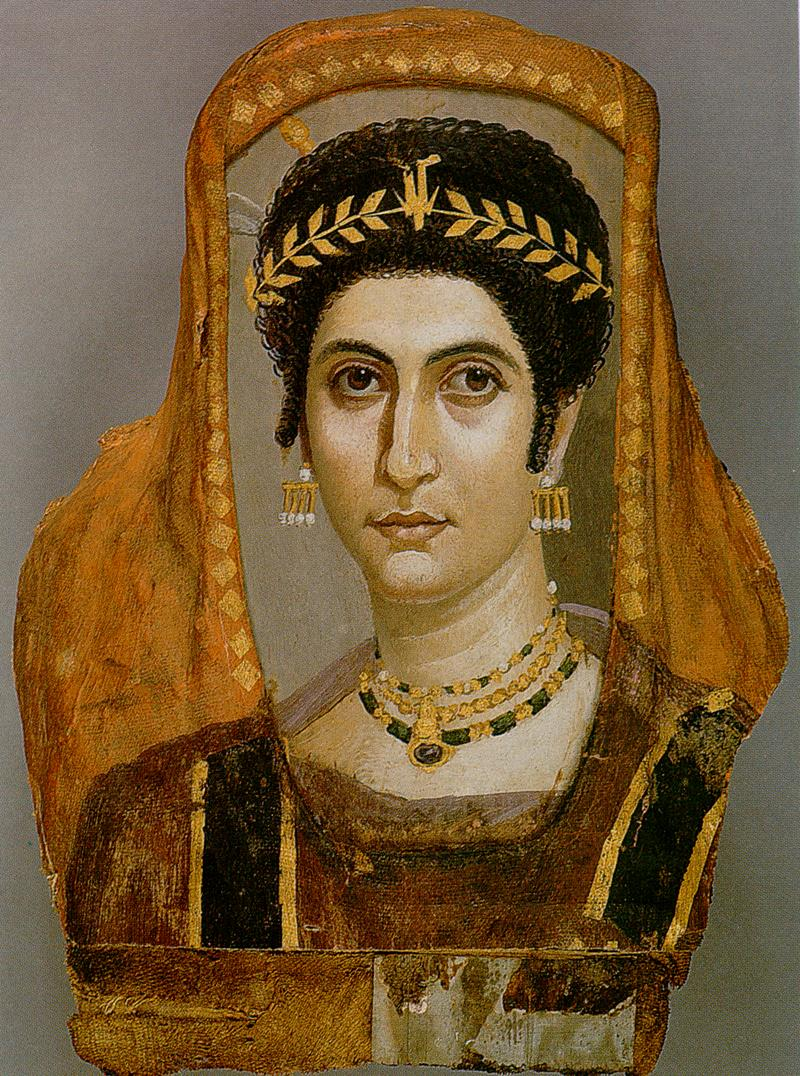

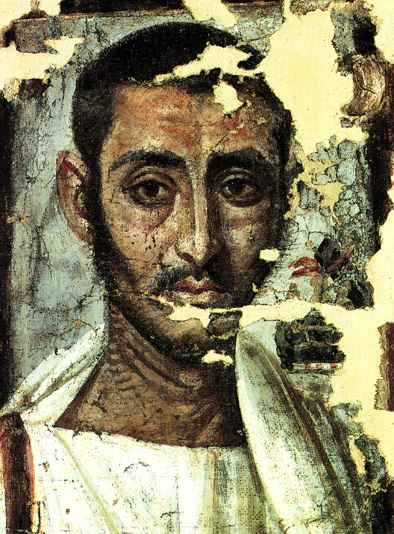

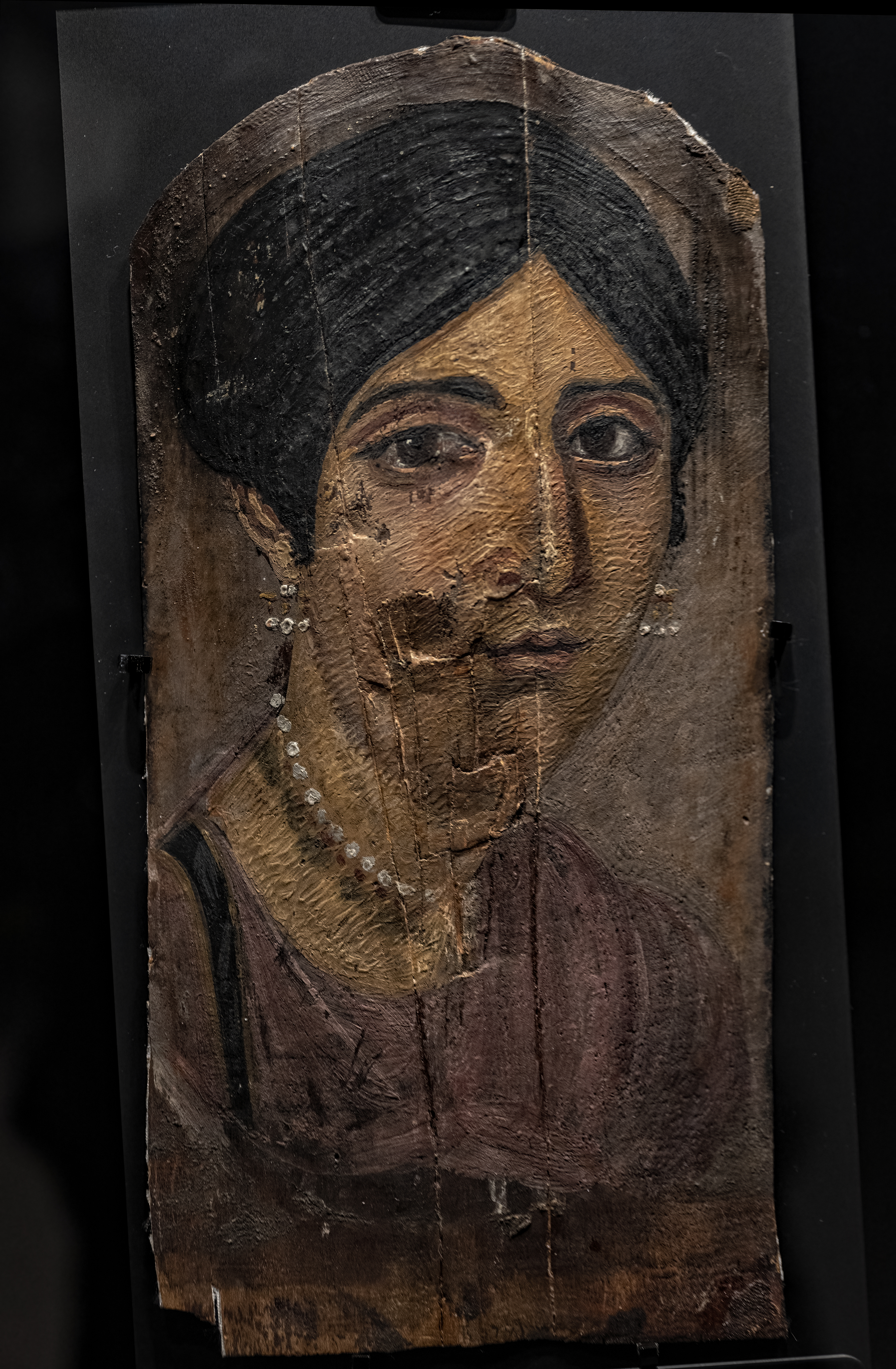

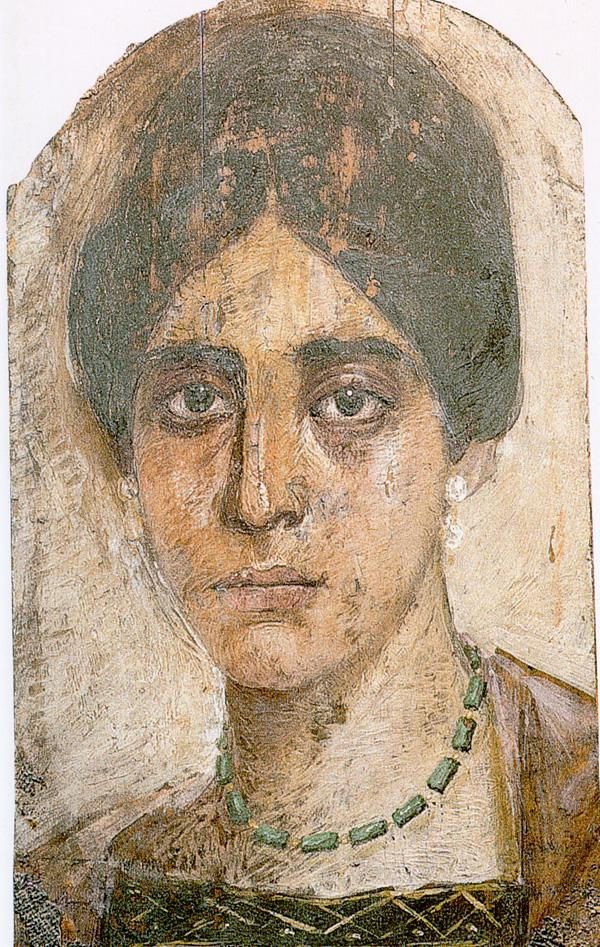

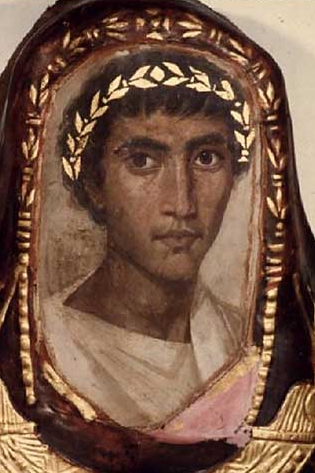

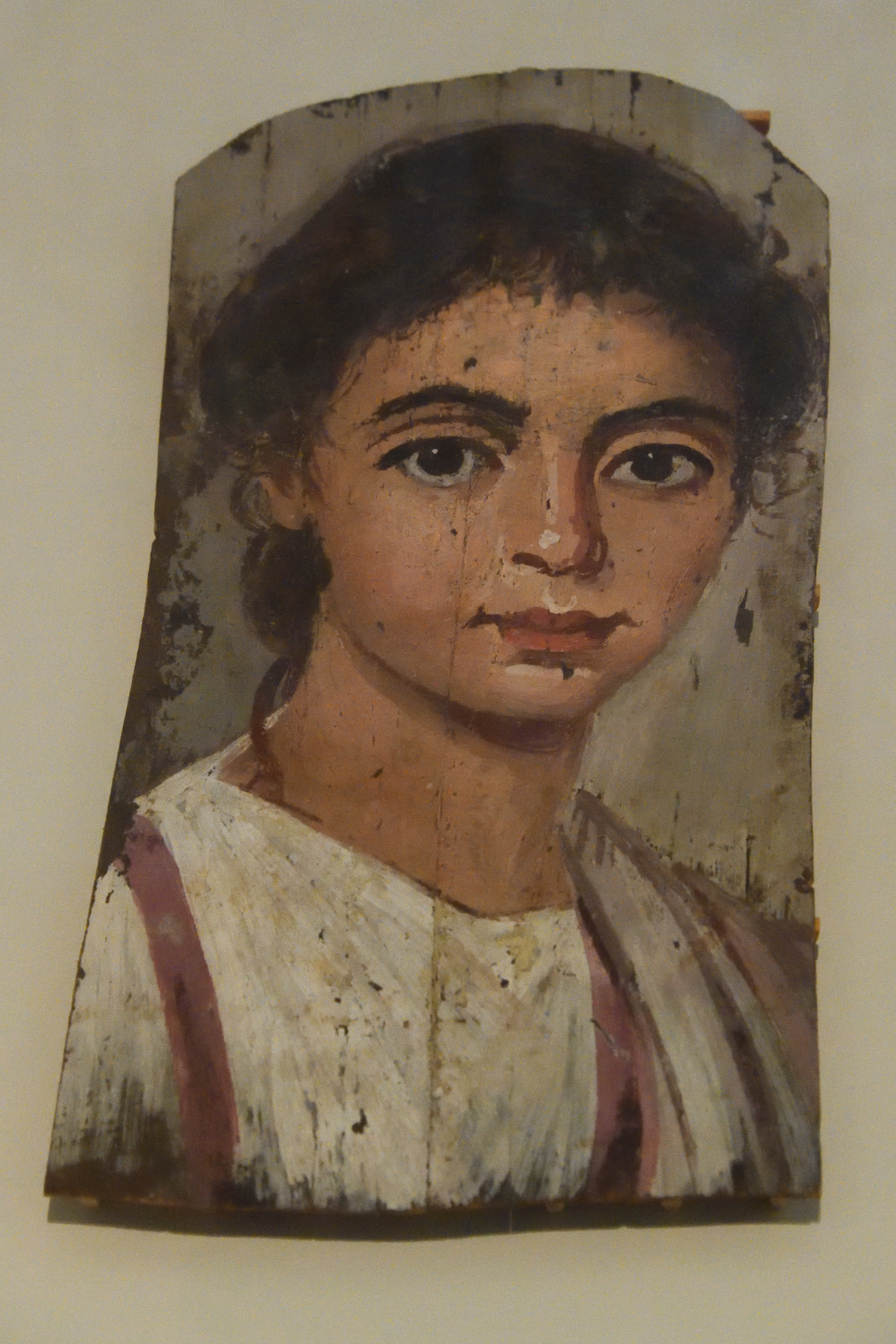

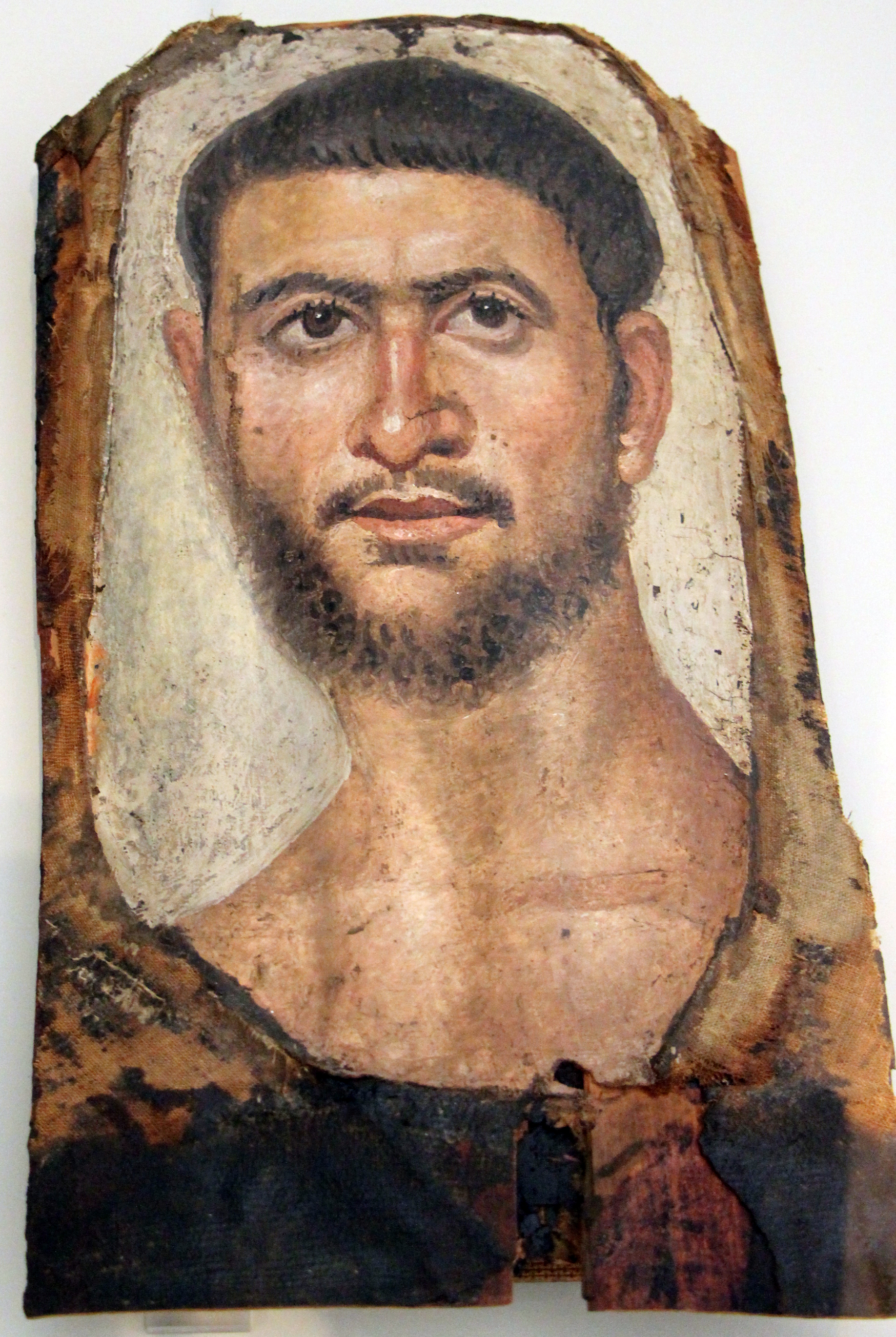

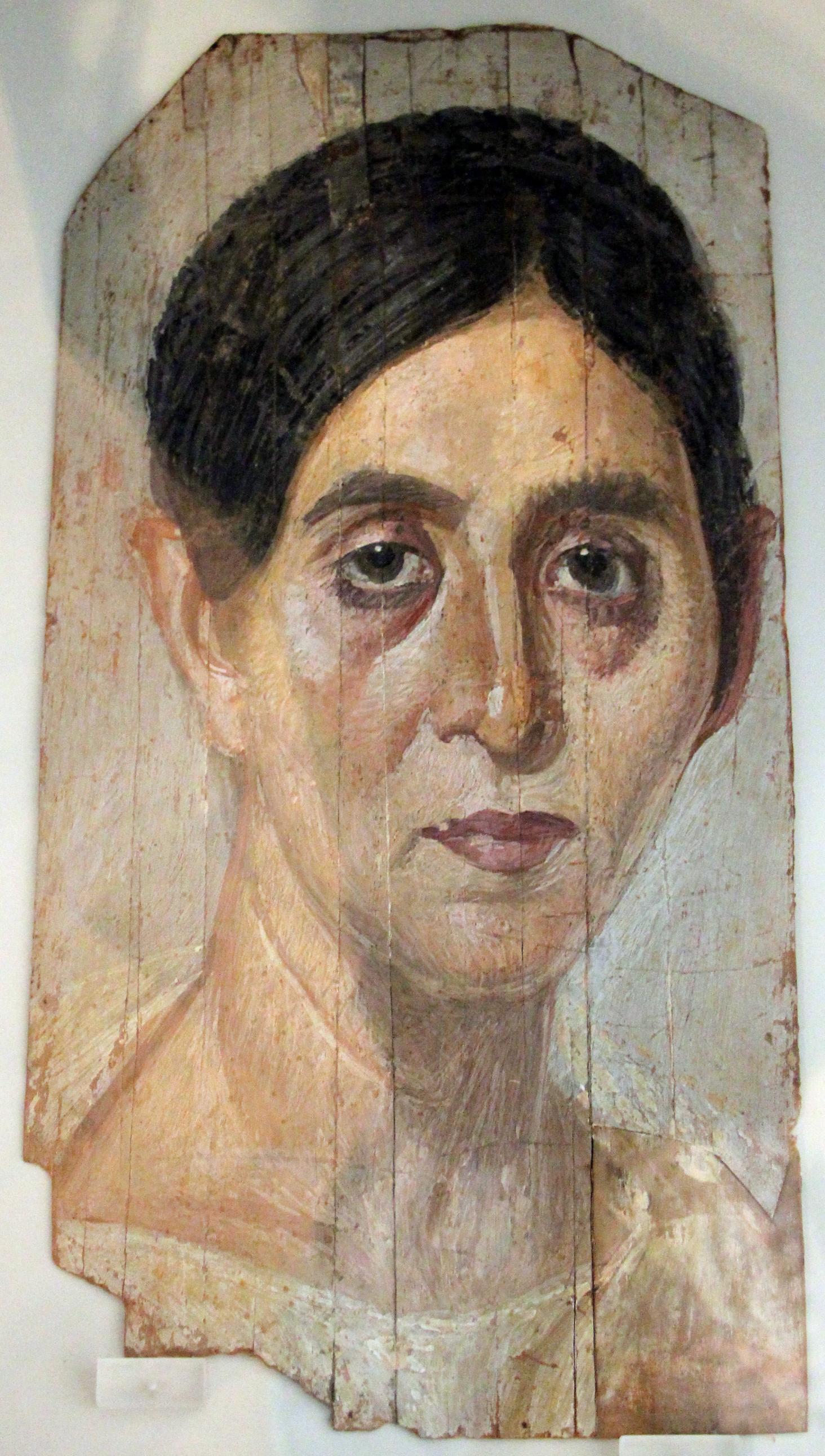

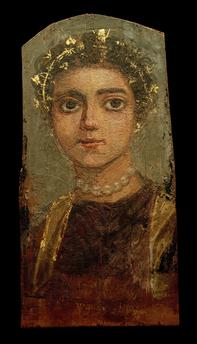

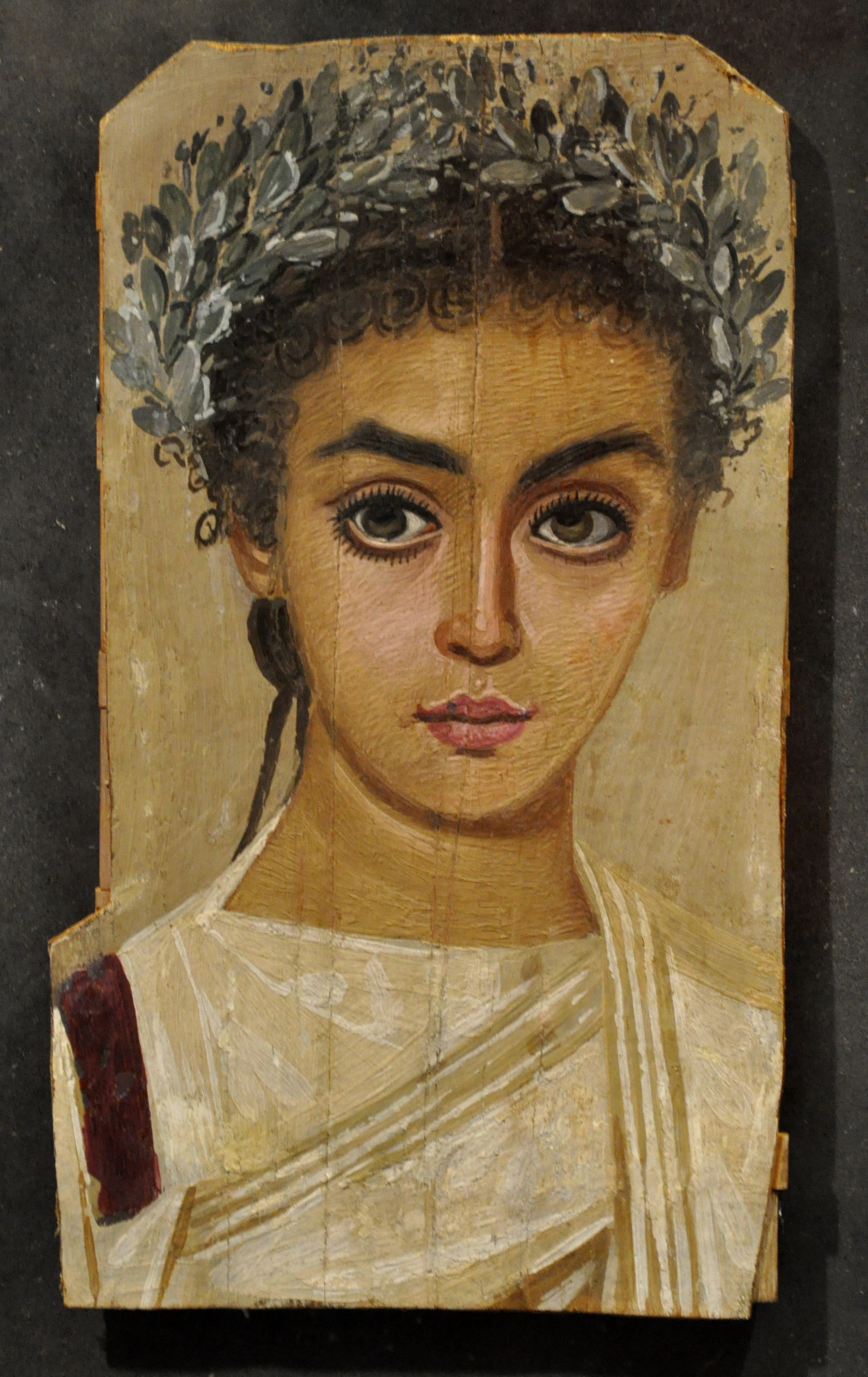

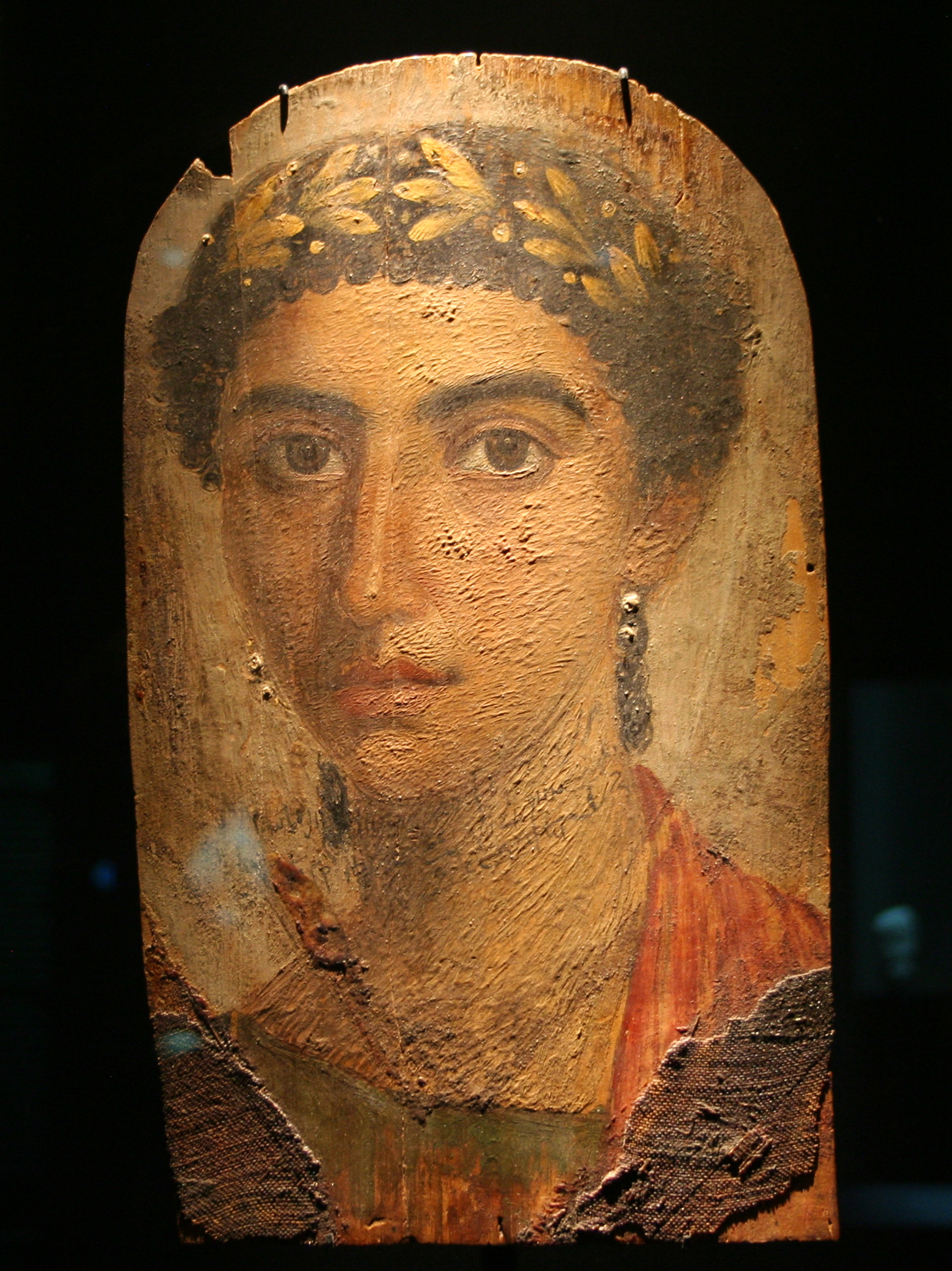

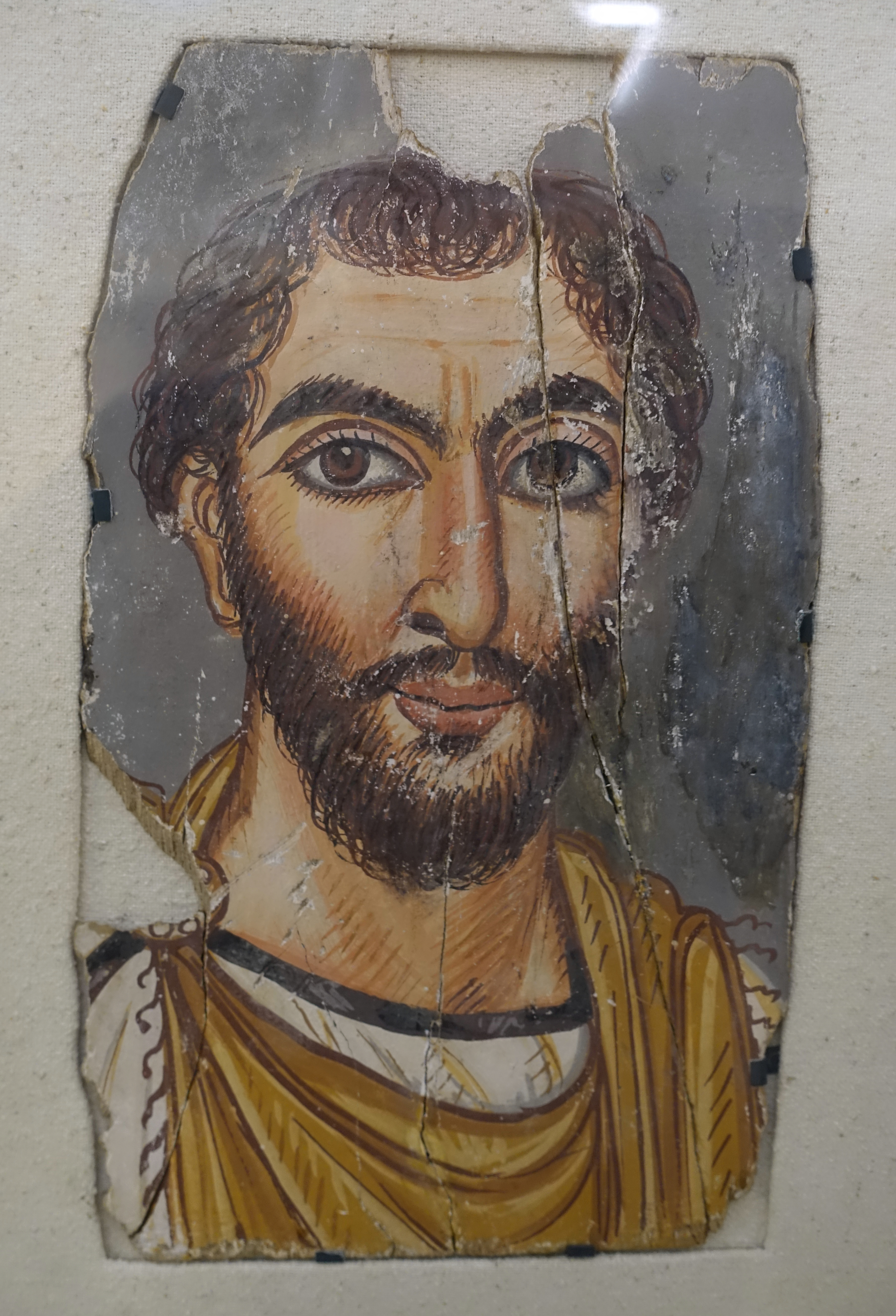

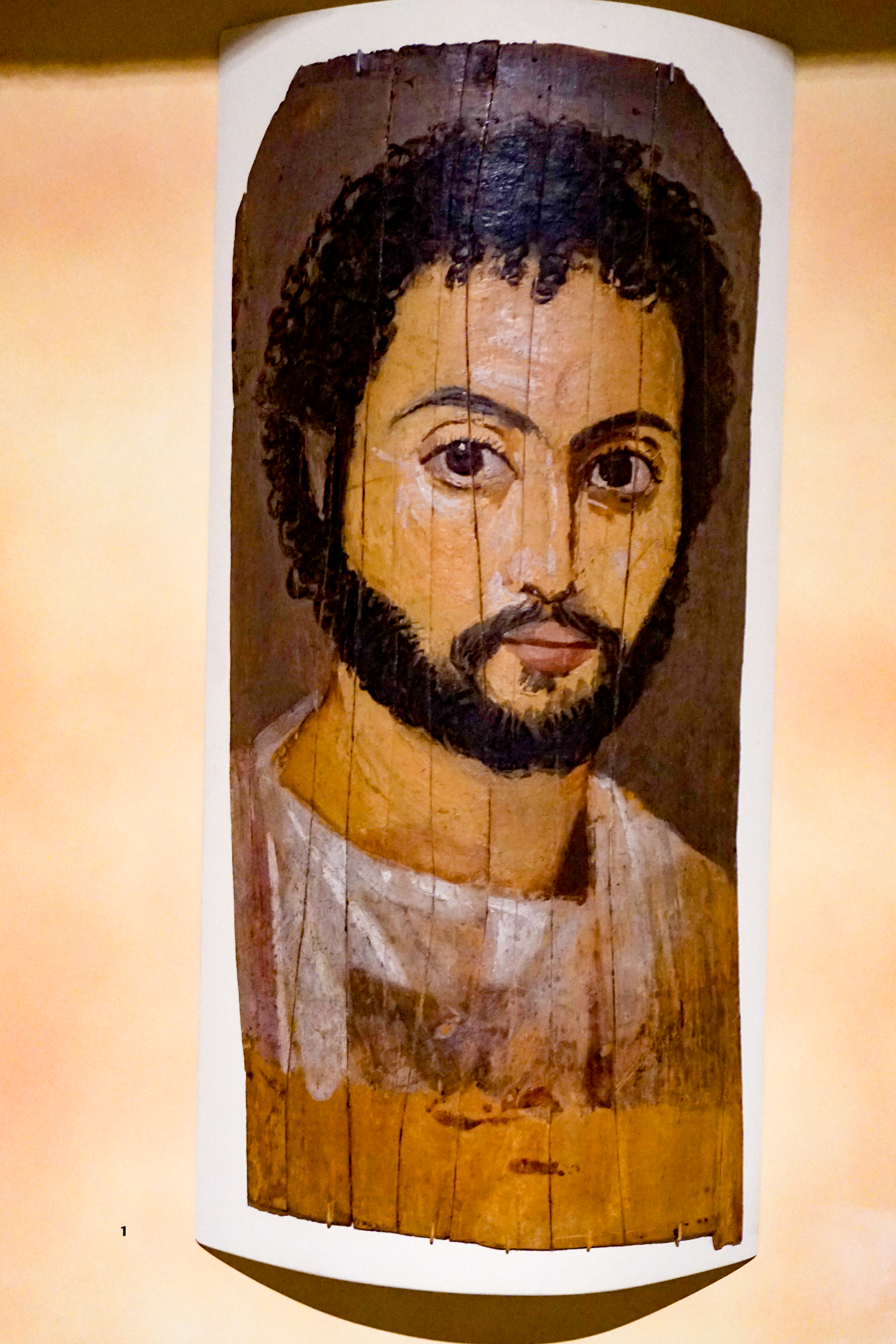

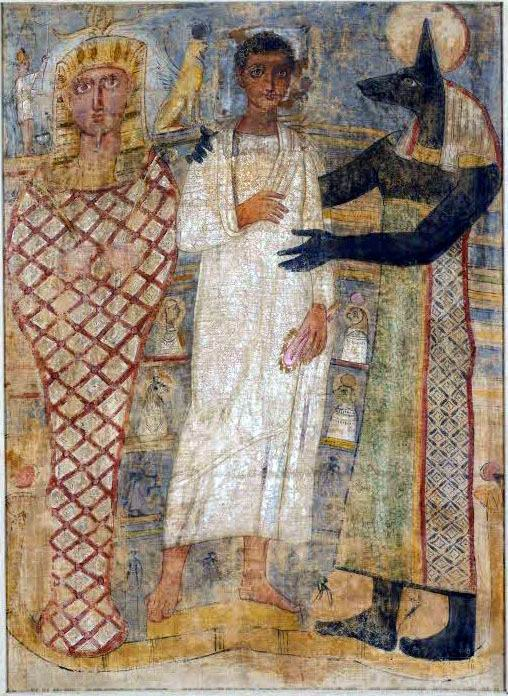

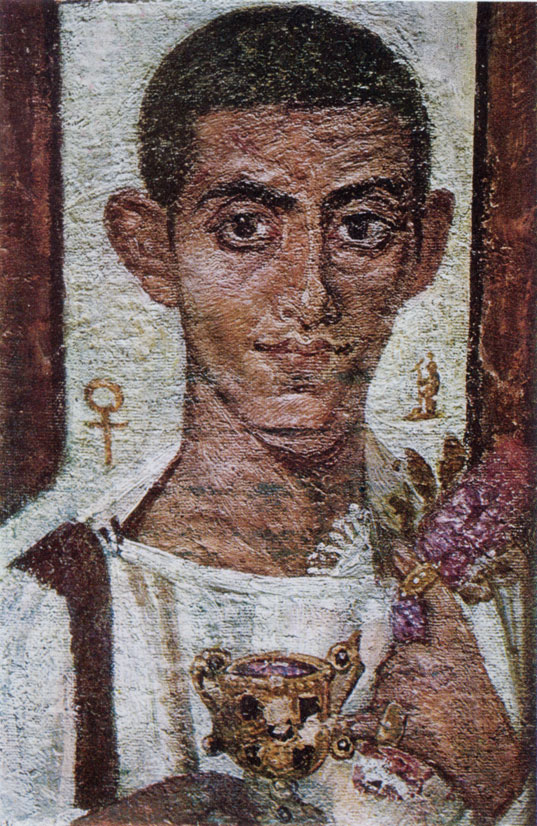

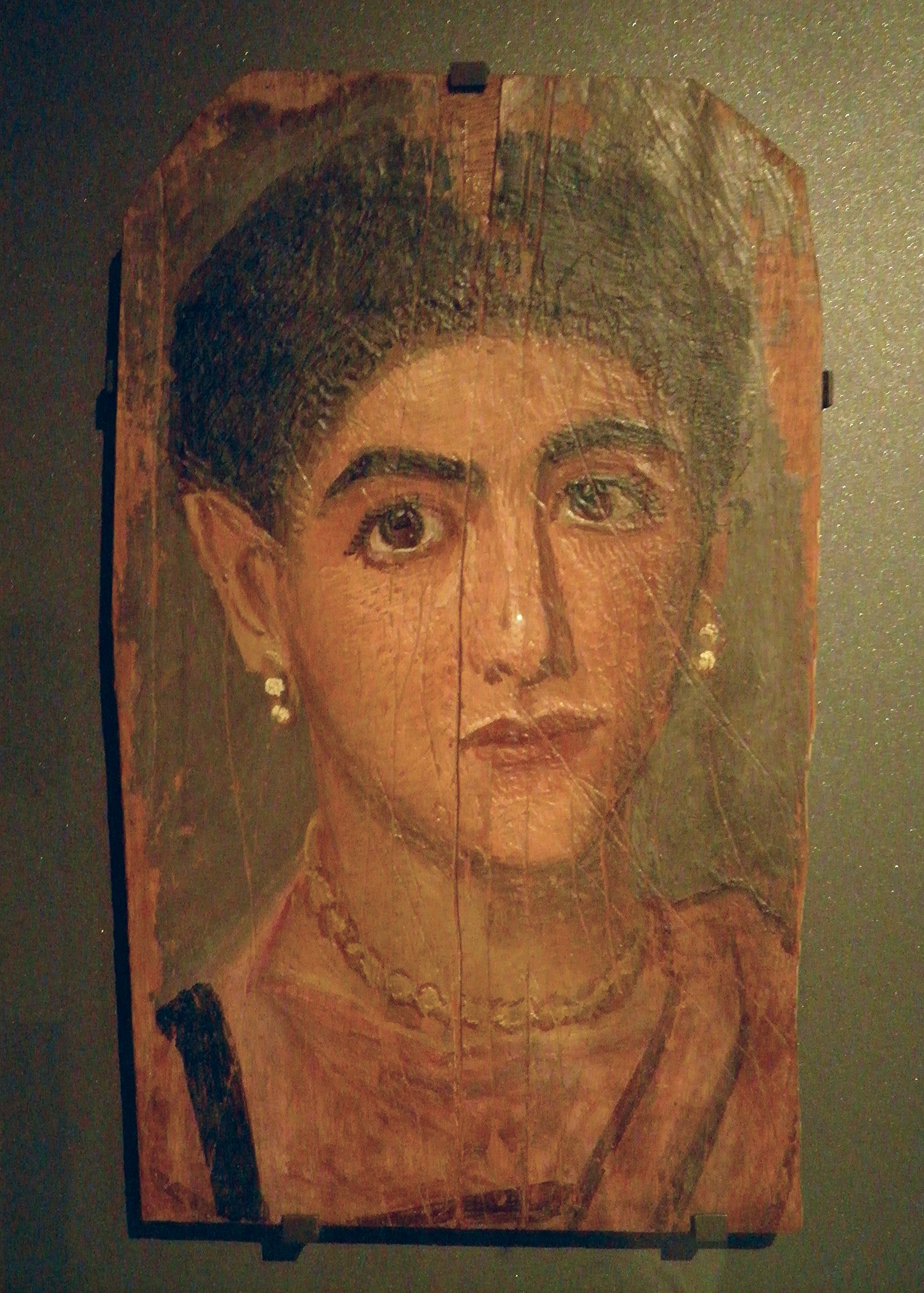

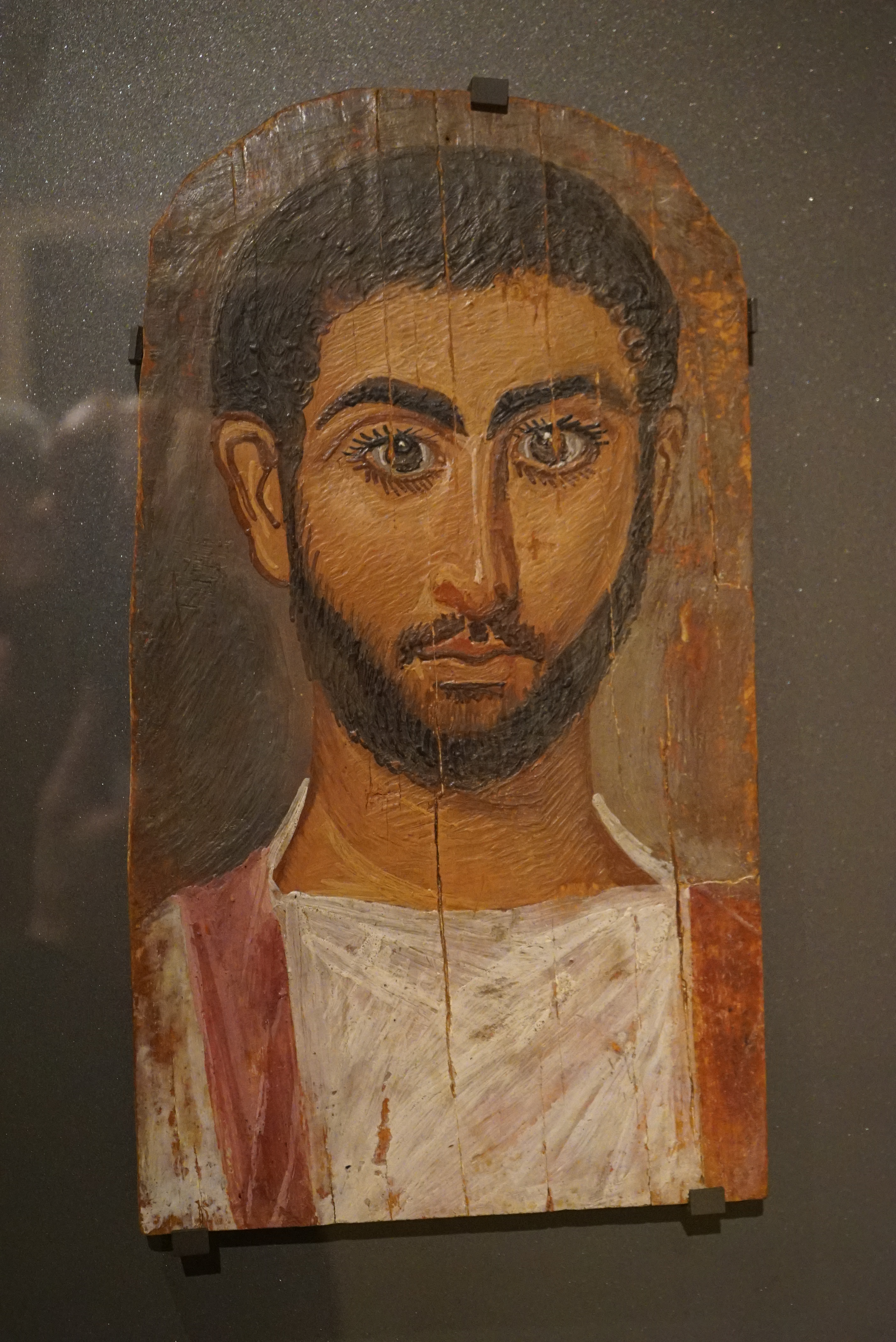

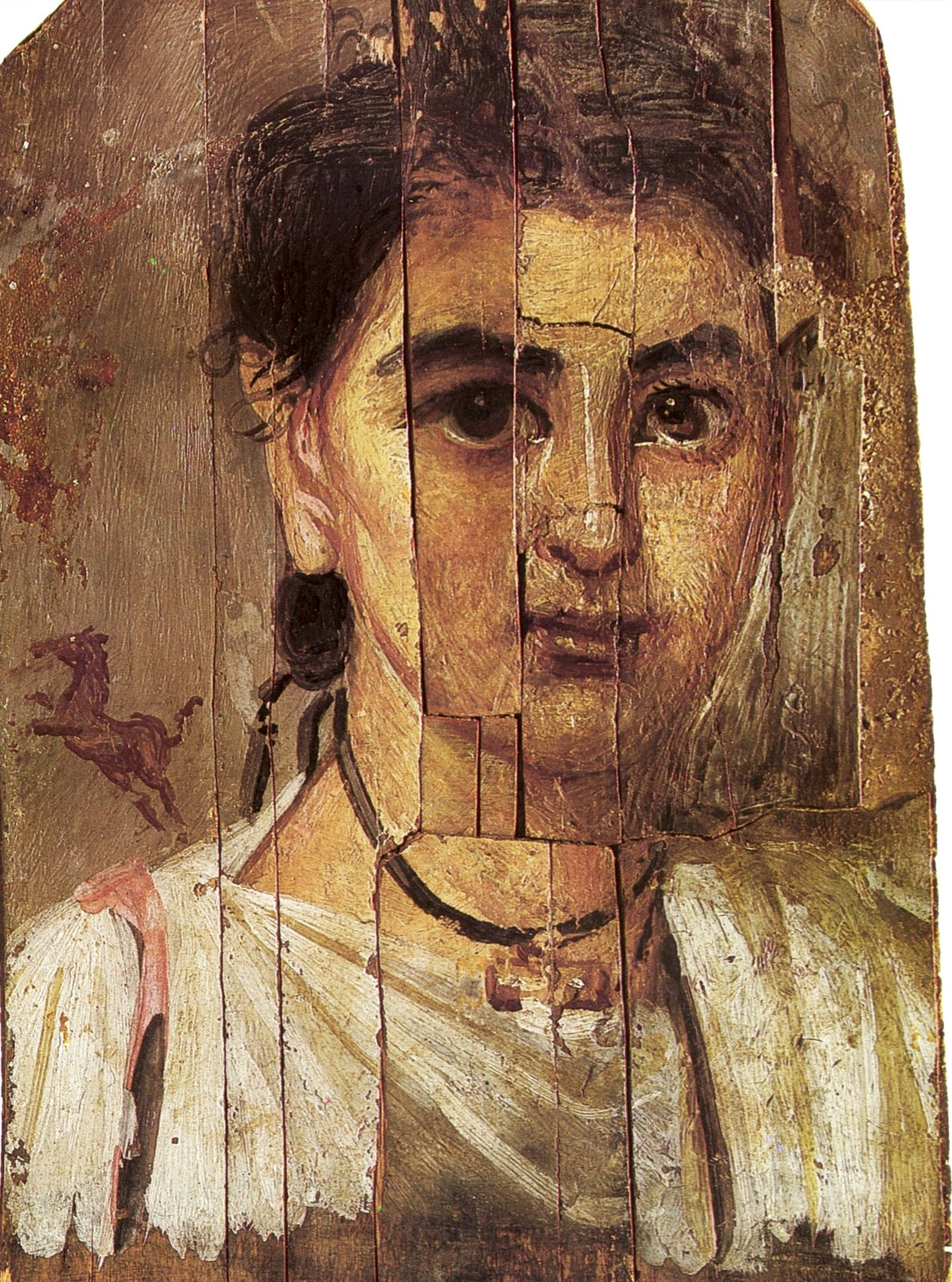

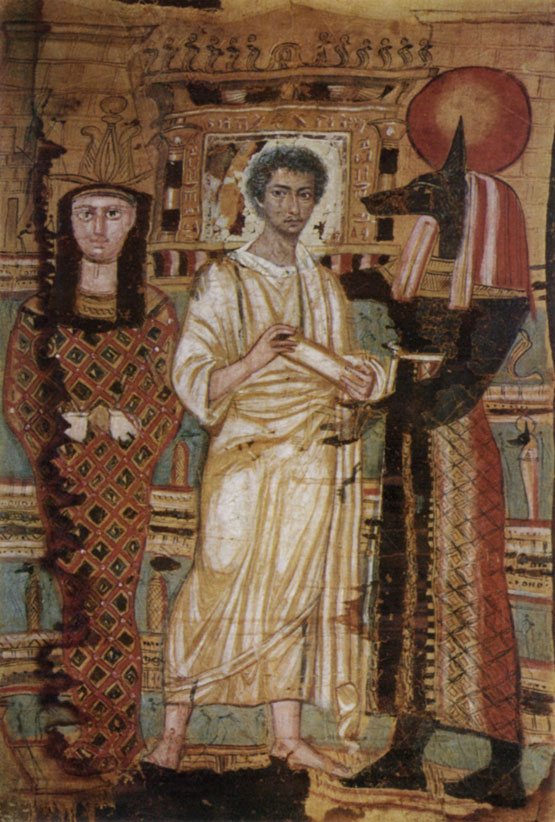

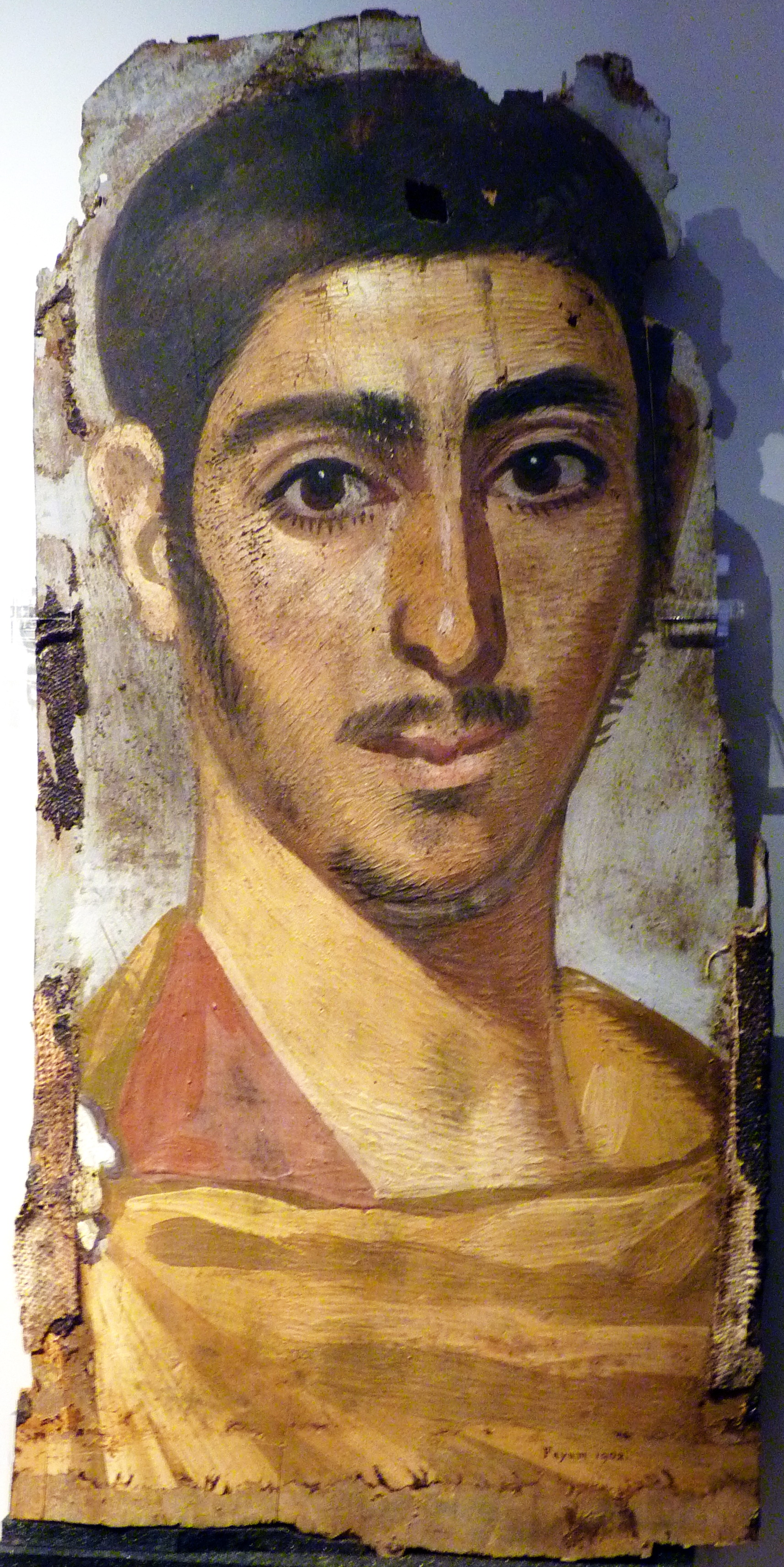

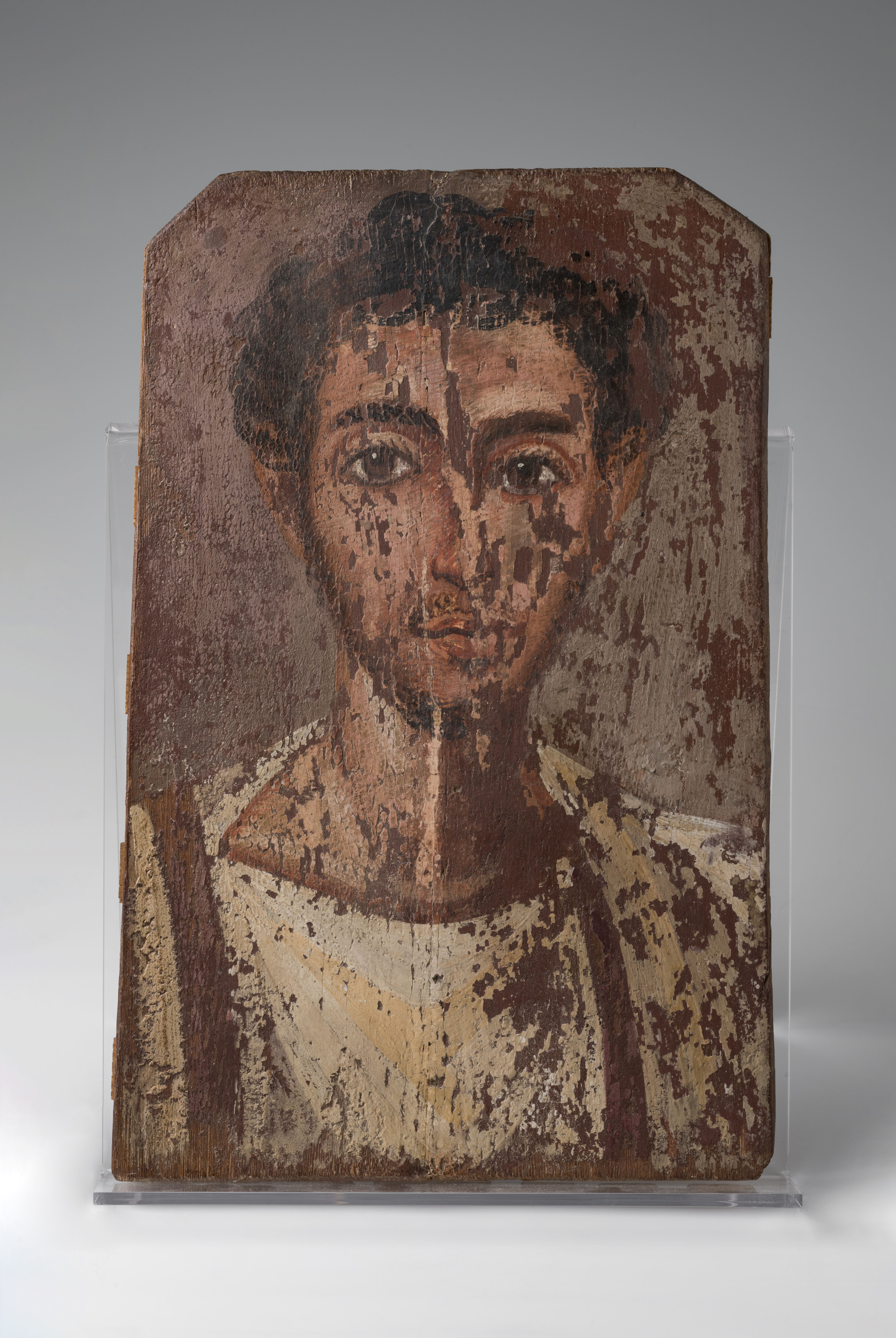

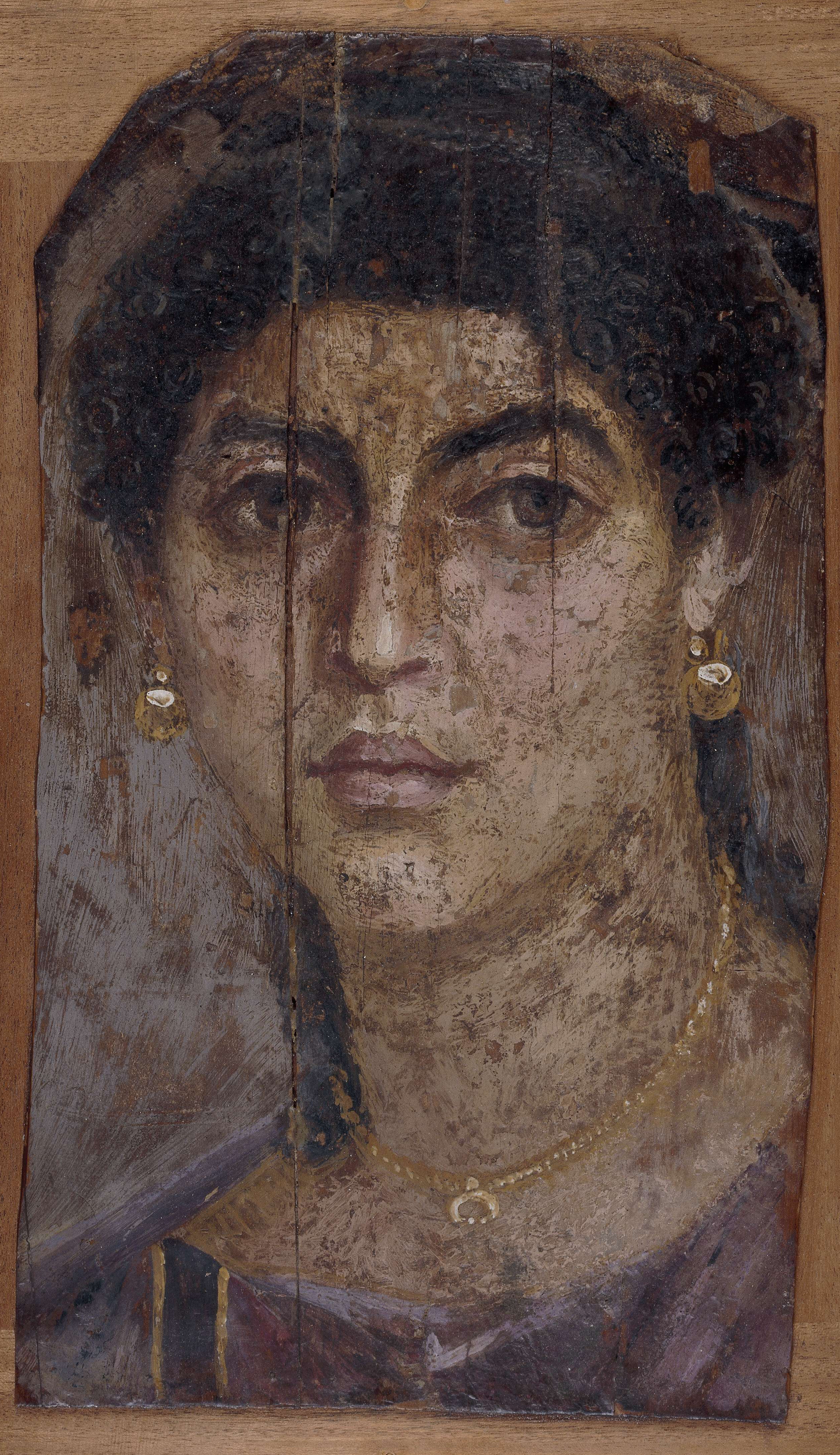

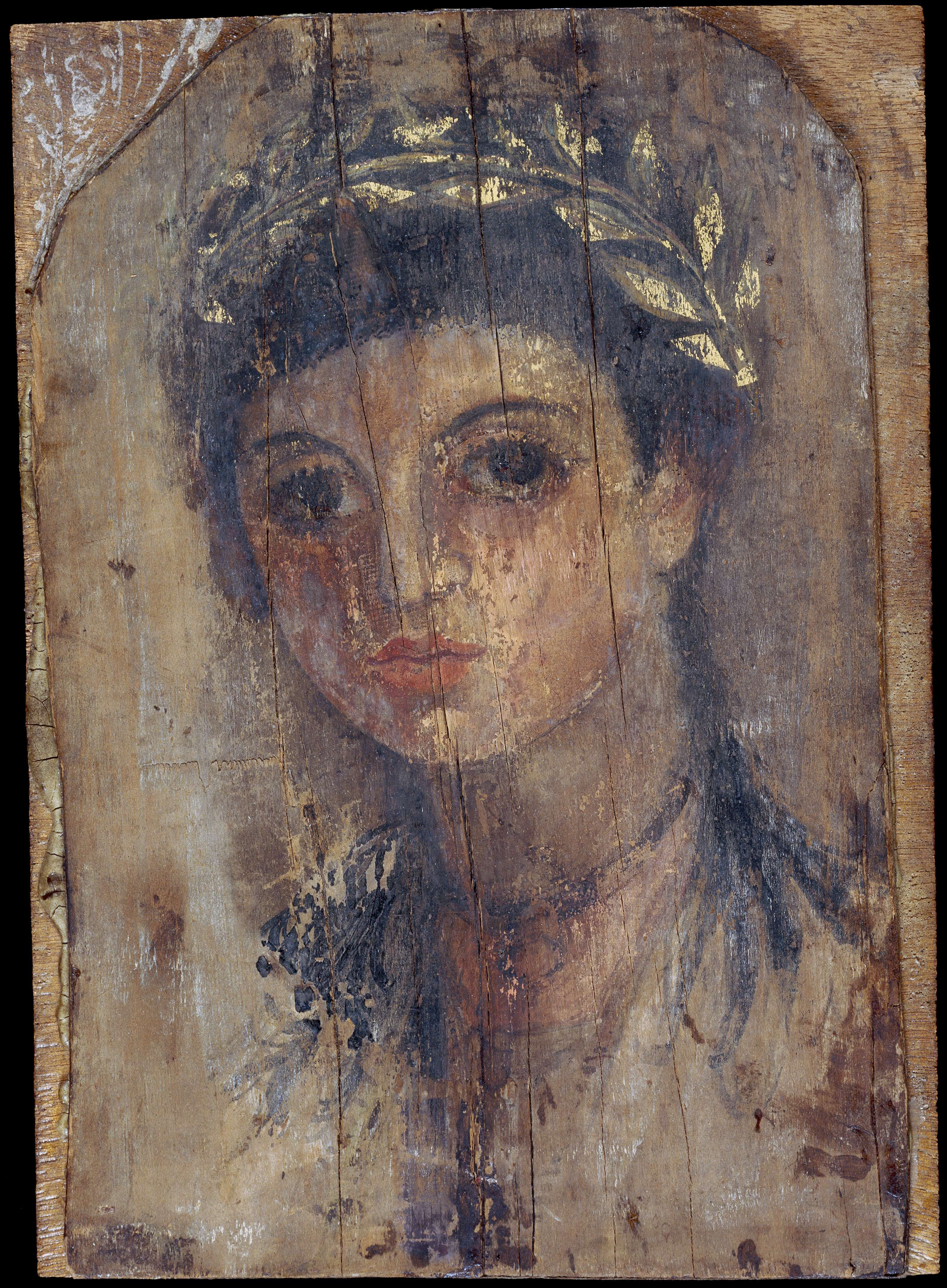

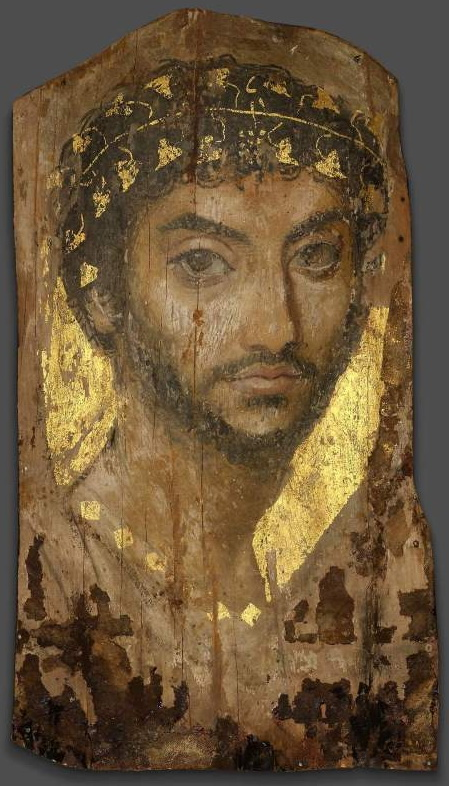

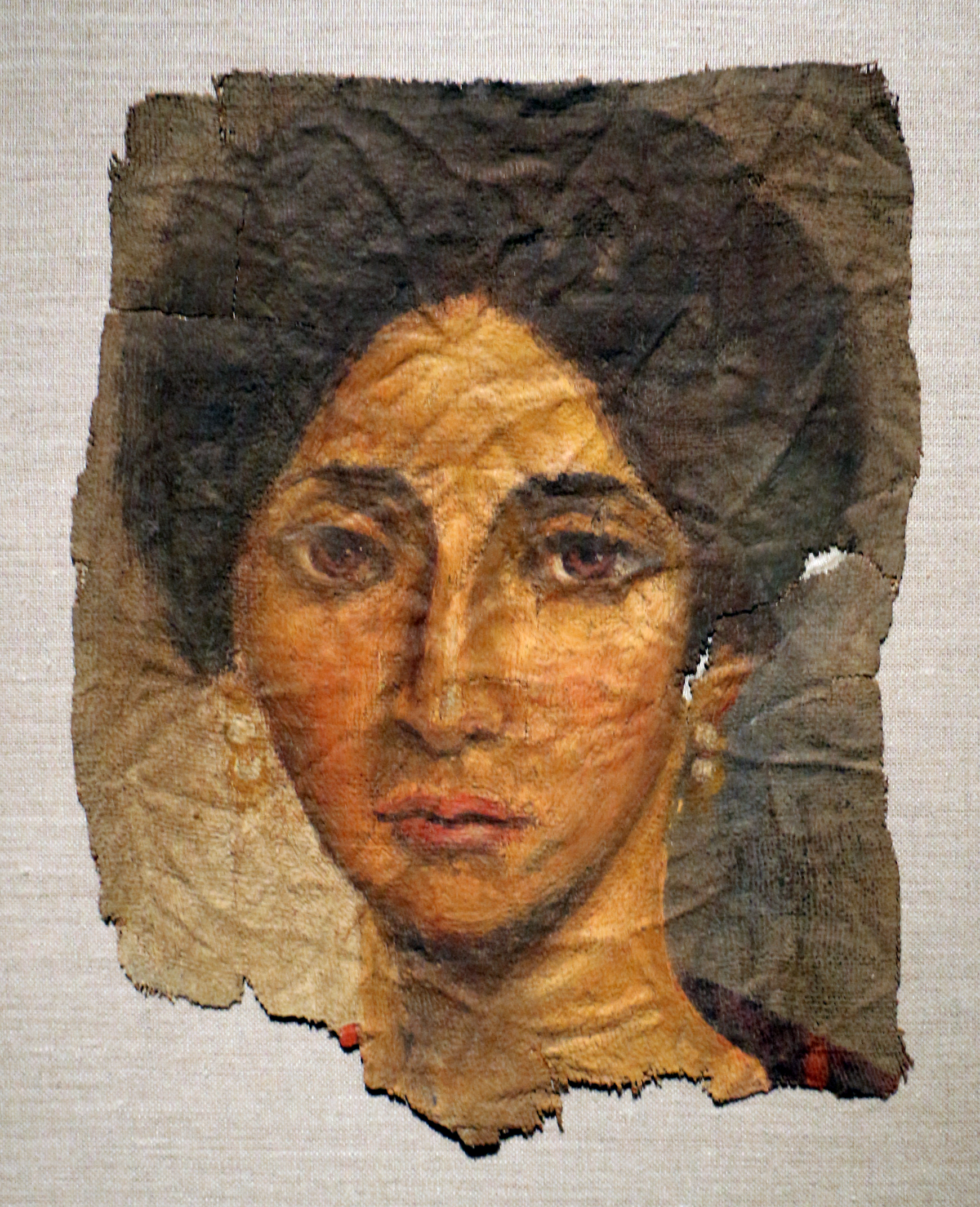

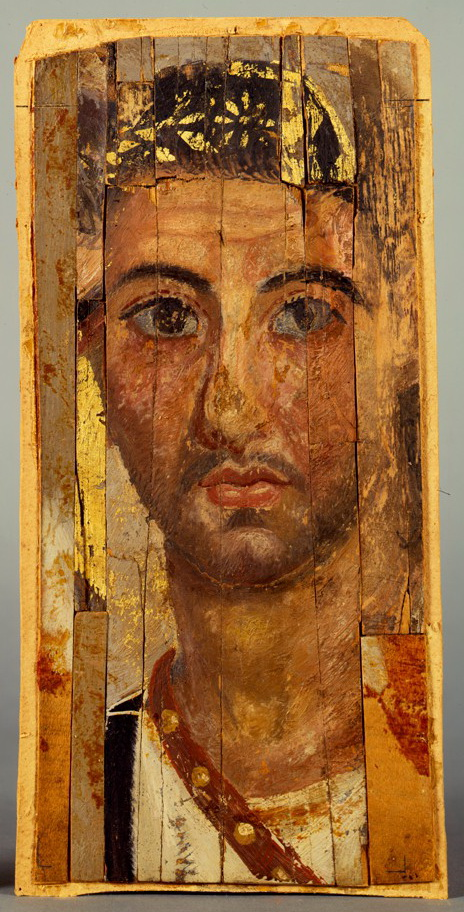

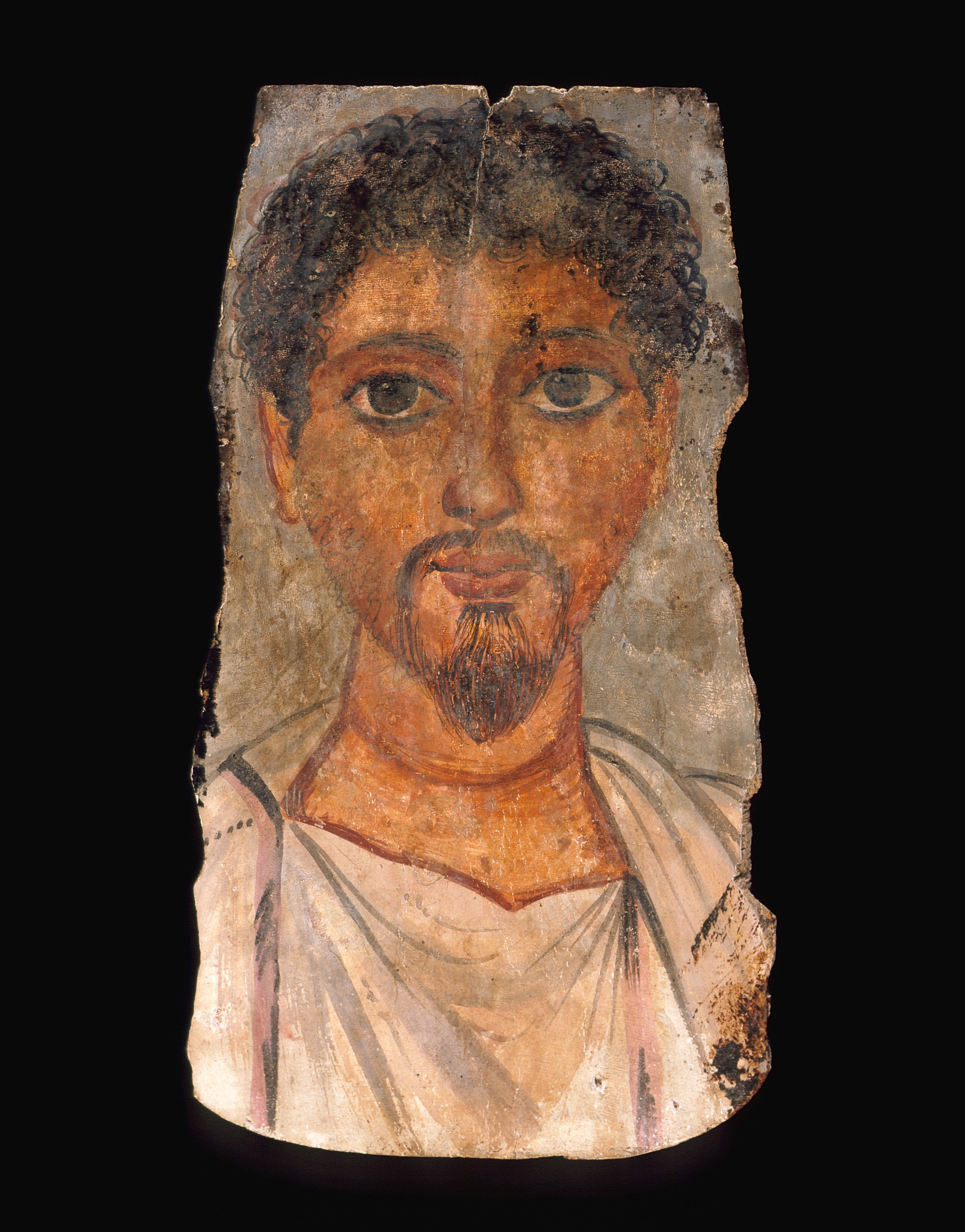

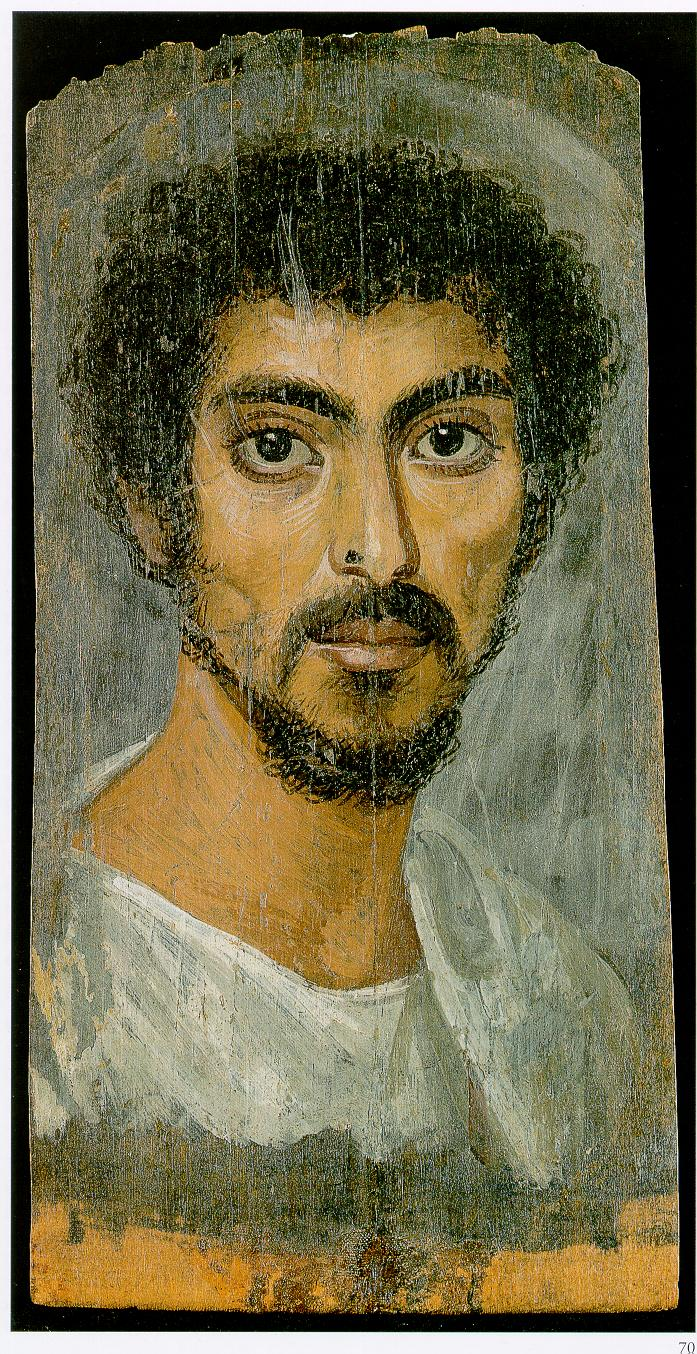

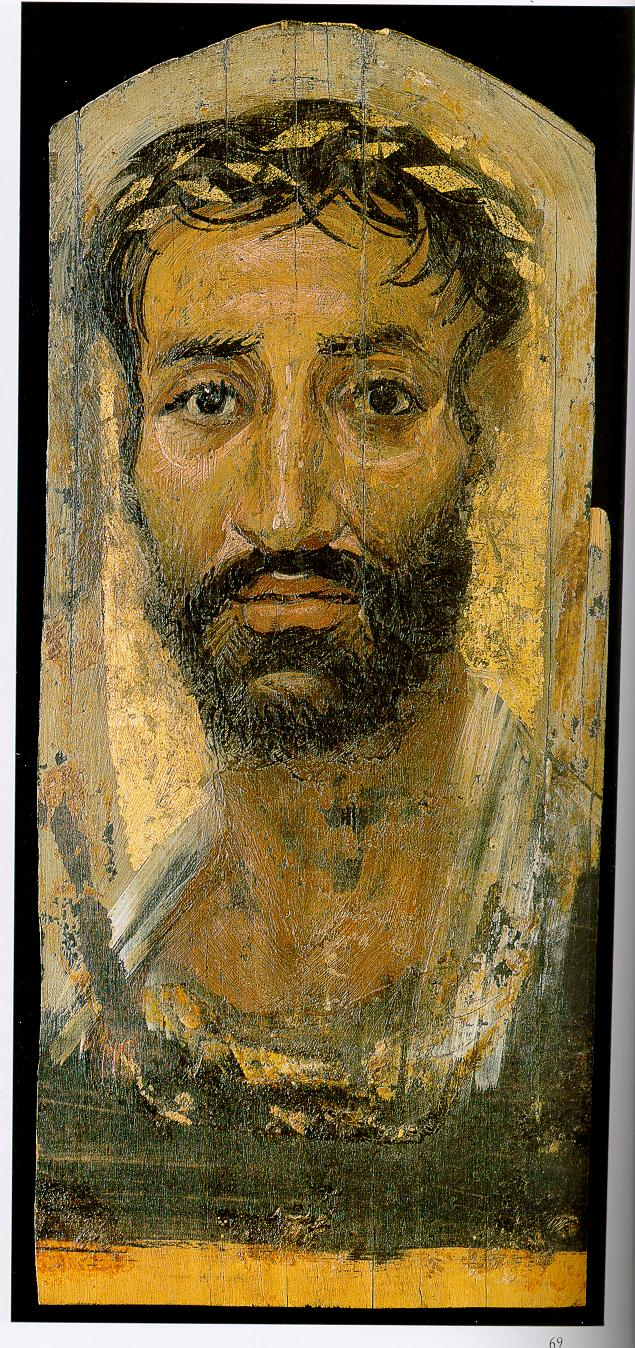

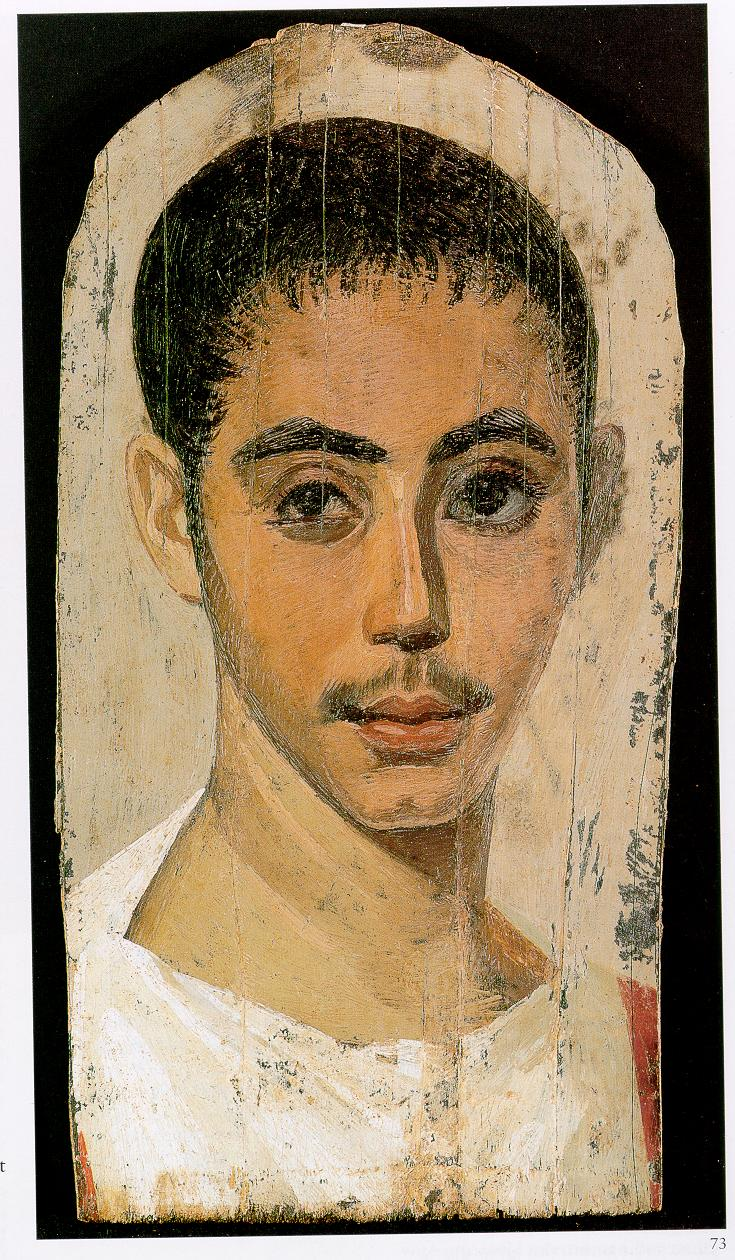

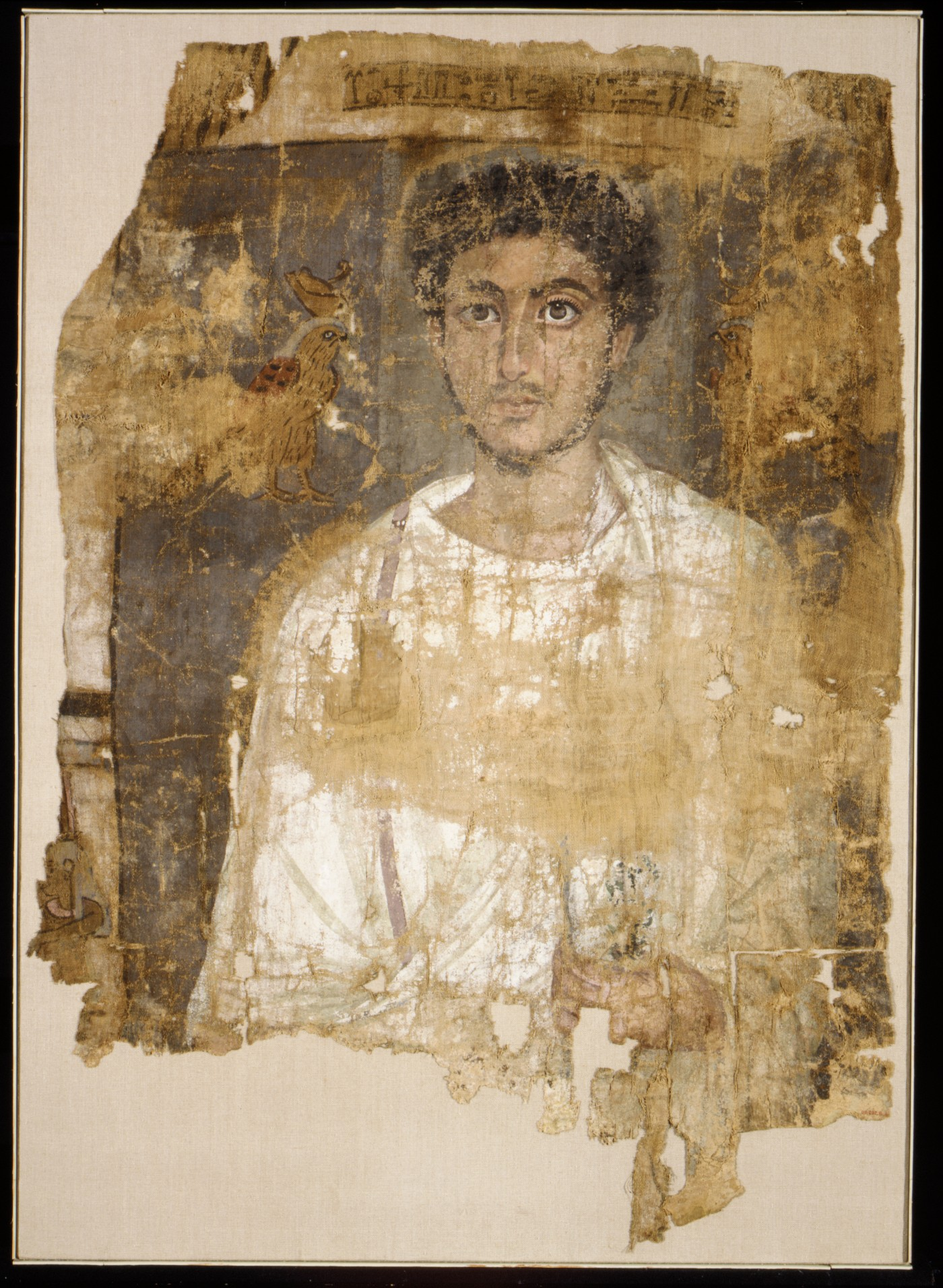

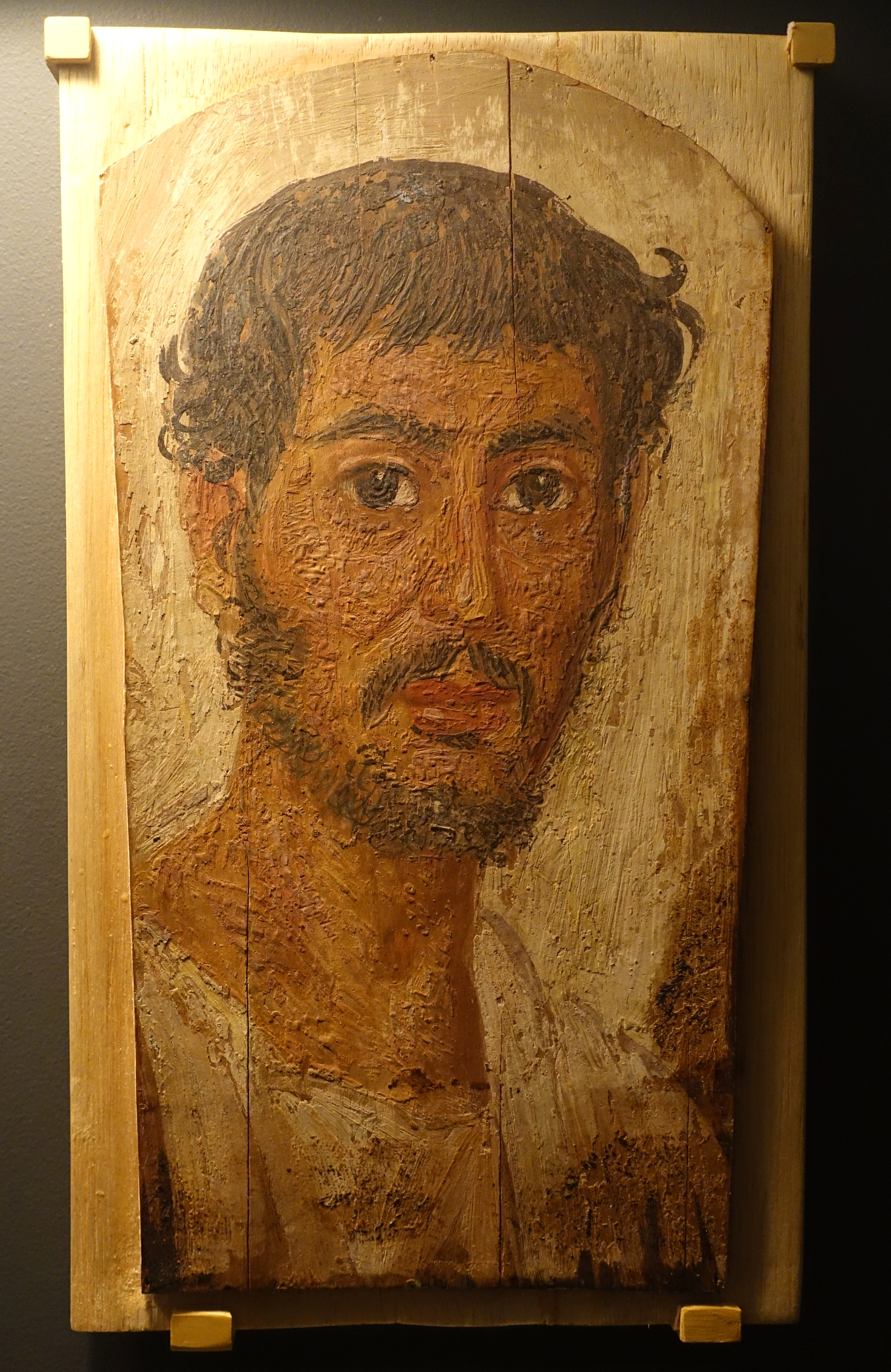

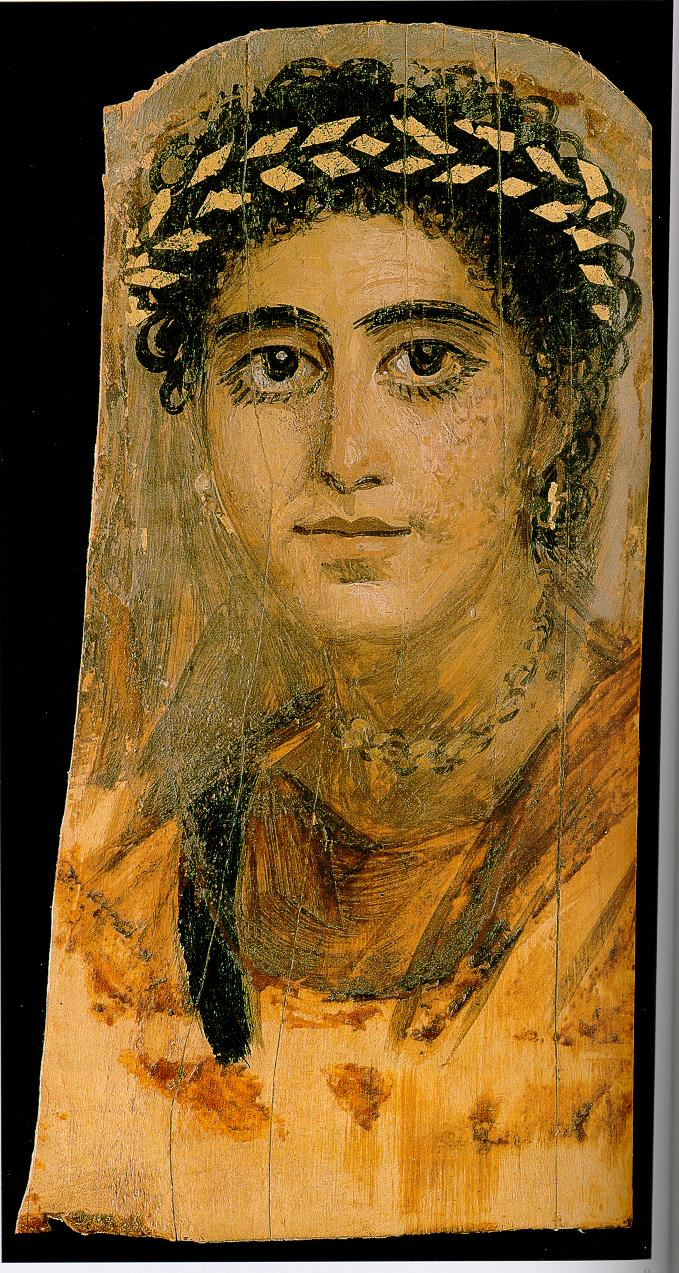

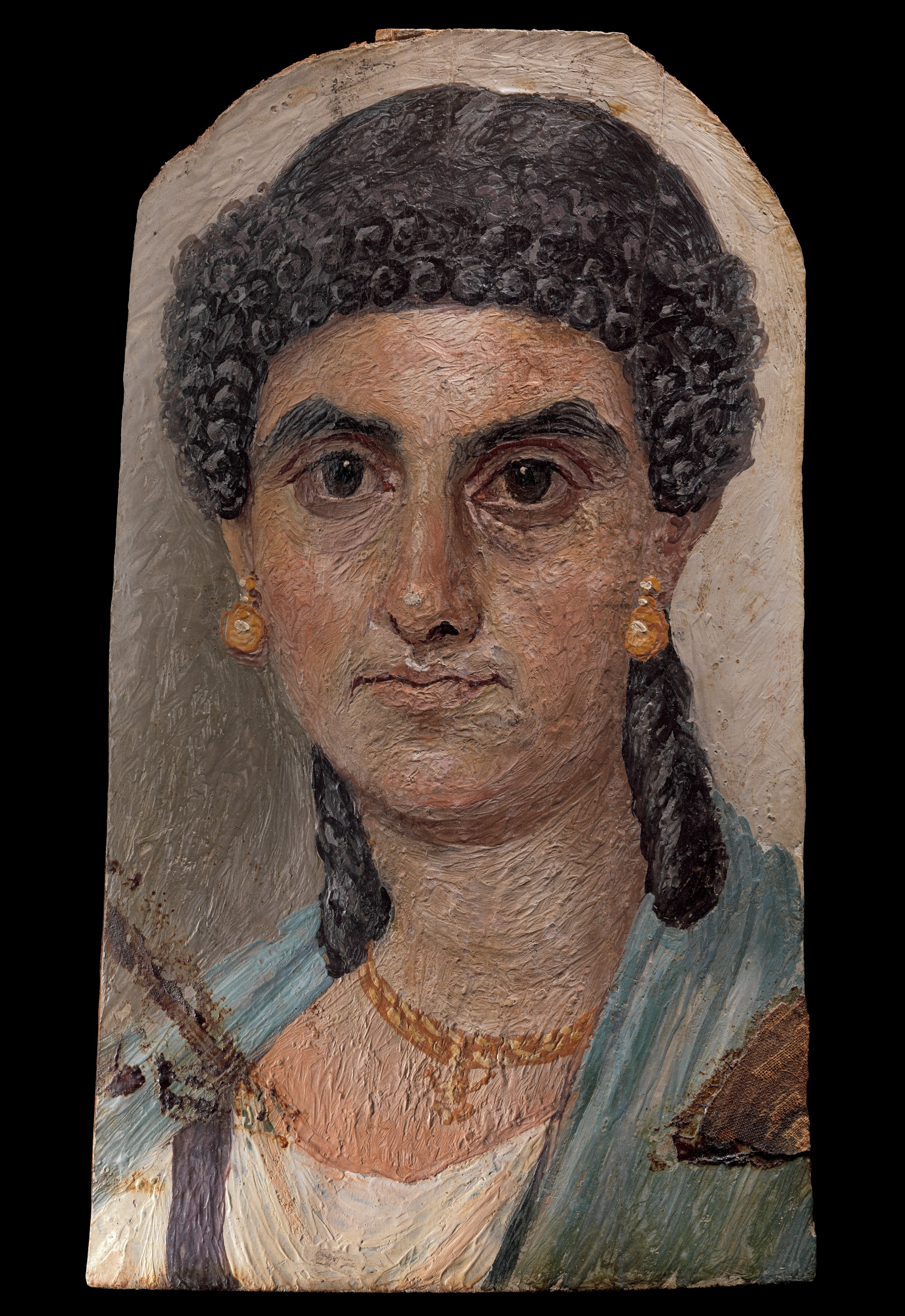

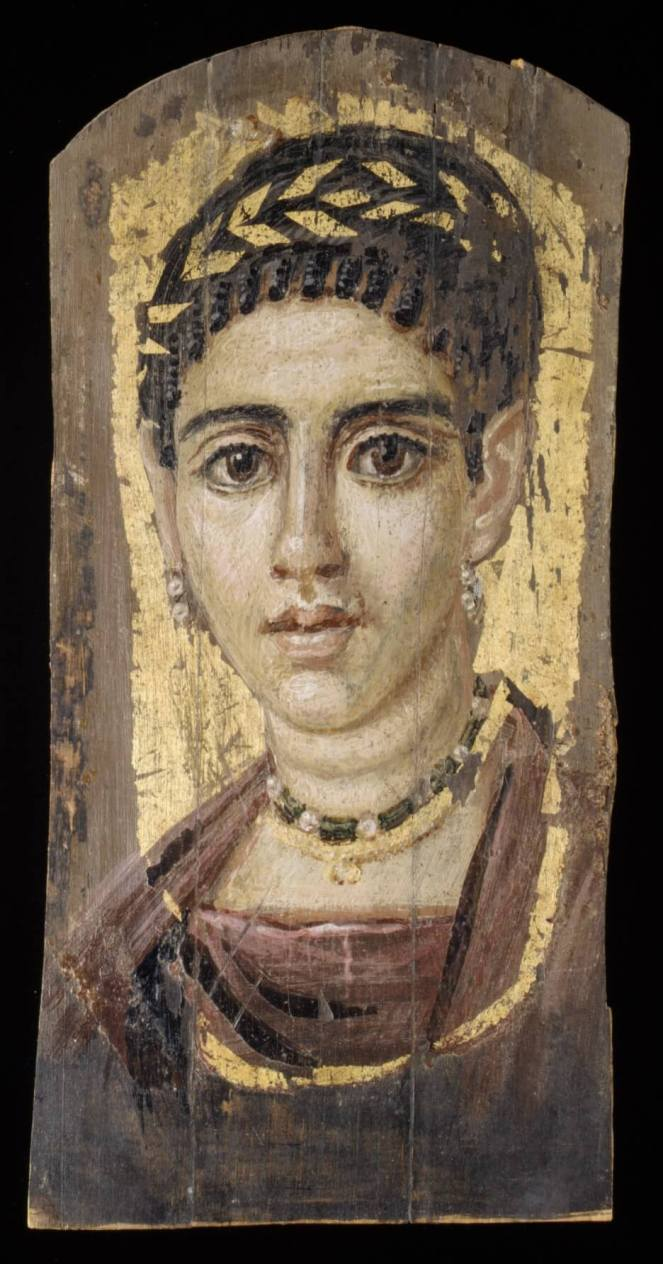

== In popular culture ==
The Fayum mummy images were used to recreate Jewish faces from first-century Judaea for the 2021 Israeli film Legend of Destruction.

== See also ==
- Ancient Roman art
- Coptic art
- Coptic Museum
- Pitsa panels
- Malibu Painter

== Bibliography ==
(chronological order)

- W. M. Flinders Petrie (1911). Roman Portraits and Memphis (IV). London. Archived from the original on 27 December 2007 – via ETANA (Electronic Tools and Ancient Near Eastern Archives).
- Klaus Parlasca: Mumienporträts und verwandte Denkmäler, Wiesbaden 1966
- Klaus Parlasca: Ritratti di mummie, Repertorio d'arte dell'Egitto greco-romano Vol. B, 1-4, Rome 1969–2003 (Corpus of most of the known mummy portraits)
- Henning Wrede (1982). "Mumienporträts". Lexikon der Ägyptologie. Vol. IV. Wiesbaden. pp. 218–222.
- Drower, Margaret S. (1985). Flinders Petrie: A Life in Archaeology. London: Victor Gollancz Ltd. ISBN 0-575-03667-2. OCLC 1280805871.
- Euphrosyne Doxiadis: The Mysterious Fayum Portraits. Thames and Hudson, 1995
- Barbara Borg: Mumienporträts. Chronologie und kultureller Kontext, Mainz 1996, ISBN 3-8053-1742-5
- Susan Walker; Morris Bierbrier (1997). Ancient Faces, Mummy Portraits from Roman Egypt. London. ISBN 0-7141-0989-4.
- Barbara Borg (1998). "Der zierlichste Anblick der Welt ...". Ägyptische Porträtmumien. Zaberns Bildbände zur Archäologie/ Sonderhefte der Antiken Welt. Mainz am Rhein: Von Zabern. ISBN 3-8053-2264-X; ISBN 3-8053-2263-1
- Wilfried Seipel (ed.): Bilder aus dem Wüstensand. Mumienportraits aus dem Ägyptischen Museum Kairo; eine Ausstellung des Kunsthistorischen Museums Wien, Milan/Wien/Ostfildern 1998; ISBN 88-8118-459-1;
- Klaus Parlasca; Hellmut Seemann (Hrsg.): Augenblicke. Mumienporträts und ägyptische Grabkunst aus römischer Zeit [zur Ausstellung Augenblicke – Mumienporträts und Ägyptische Grabkunst aus Römischer Zeit, in der Schirn-Kunsthalle Frankfurt (30. Januar bis 11. April 1999)], München 1999, ISBN 3-7814-0423-4
- Nicola Hoesch (2000). "Mumienporträts". Der Neue Pauly. Vol. 8. pp. 464f.
- Susan Walker, ed. (2000). Ancient Faces. Mummy Portraits from Roman Egypt. New York. ISBN 0-415-92744-7.
- Paula Modersohn-Becker und die ägyptischen Mumienportraits ... Katalogbuch zur Ausstellung in Bremen, Kunstsammlung Böttcherstraße, 14.10.2007–24.2.2008, München 2007, ISBN 978-3-7774-3735-4
- Jan Picton, Stephen Quirke, Paul C. Roberts (ed): Living Images, Egyptian Funerary Portraits in the Petrie Museum, Walnut Creek CA 2007 ISBN 978-1-59874-251-0
