= Aline (given name) =

Aline is a feminine given name, and may refer to:

== People ==
- Aline Abboud, German journalist
- Aline Alaux, French painter
- Aline Amaru (born 1941), Tahitian textile artist
- Aline Atherton-Smith (1875–1956), English Quaker activist and writer
- Aline van Barentzen (1897–1981), American classical pianist
- Aline Barnsdall (1882–1946), American oil heiress
- Aline Barros, musical artist
- Aline Bernstein (1880–1955), American costume designer and co-founder of the Museum of Costume Art
- Aline Elizabeth Black (1906–1974), American educator
- Aline Reese Blondner (1844–1931), American musician and educator
- Aline Bock (born 1982), German freeride snowboarder
- Aline Bonami, French mathematician
- Aline Bonetto, French production designer and set decorator
- Aline Brosh McKenna, American screenwriter, producer, and director
- Aline Camboulives (born 1973), French long-distance runner
- Aline B. Carter (1892–1972), American poet
- Aline Charigot (1859–1915), wife and model of Auguste Renoir
- Aline Chrétien (1936–2020), wife of former Canadian prime minister Jean Chrétien
- Aline Coutrot (1927–1987), French historian and political scientist
- Aline Danioth, Swiss World Cup alpine ski racer
- Aline Davis Hays (1887–1944), American clothing designer, textile manufacturer, and arts promoter
- Aline Dias (born 1991), Brazilian actress
- Aline Sitoe Diatta (1920–1944), Senegalese heroine of the resistance to French colonialism
- Aline Duval (1824–1903), French actress
- Aline Ehrlich (1928–1991), German biologist
- Aline Fruhauf (1907–1978), American caricaturist
- Aline Griffith, Countess of Romanones (1923–2017), Spanish-American aristocrat, socialite and writer
- Aline Gomes (born 2005), Brazilian footballer
- Aline Gouget (born 1977), French mathematician
- Aline Hanson (1949–2017), Saint Martin educator
- Aline Helg (born 1953), Swiss historian
- Aline Heitaa-Archier, French Polynesian educator and activist
- Aline Rhonie Hofheimer (1909–1963), American pilot in World War II
- Aline Huke Frink (1904–2000), American mathematician and academic
- Aline Issermann (born 1948), French filmmaker
- Aline Jusria, Indonesian film editor
- Aline Murray Kilmer (1888–1941), American poet
- Aline Kiner (1959–2019), French journalist and writer
- Aline Kominsky-Crumb (1948–2022), underground comics artist
- Aline Krauter, German professional golfer
- Aline Küppenheim, Chilean actress
- Aline Lahoud (born 1986), Lebanese singer
- Aline Laurent-Mayard, podcaster
- Aline Réveillaud de Lens (1888–1925), French novelist and painter
- Aline Mackinnon (1888–1970, English politician
- Aline MacMahon (1899–1991), American actress
- Aline McDermott (1881–1951), American actress
- Aline Milene (born 1994), Brazilian footballer
- Aline Miller (born 1975), British professor of biomolecular engineering
- Aline Mosby (1922–1988), American journalist
- Aline Murray Kilmer (1888–1941), American poet
- Aline Nistad, Norwegian musician and music educator
- Aline Olvera (born 1982), Mexican rower
- Aline Pailler, French journalist and politician
- Aline (footballer, born 1982) (Aline Pellegrino), Brazilian footballer
- Aline Pettersson (born 1938), Mexican writer
- Aline Poulin, Canadian poet and writer
- Aline Marie Raynal (1937–2022), French botanist and botanical illustrator
- Aline (footballer, born 1989) (Aline Reis), Brazilian footballer
- Aline Rhonie (1909–1963), American aviator
- Aline Riera (born 1972), French footballer
- Aline Rocha, Brazilian wheelchair racer and skier
- Aline Rodrigues (born 1995), Brazilian swimmer
- Aline Caroline de Rothschild (1867–1909), French socialite
- Aline Rotter-Focken, German freestyle writer
- Aline Rougier, French scientist
- Aline B. Saarinen (1914–1972), American art critic
- Aline Saint-Amand (born 1936), Canadian politician
- Aline Mayrisch de Saint-Hubert (1874–1947), Luxembourgish women's rights campaigner
- Aline Santos (born 1981), Brazilian handball player
- Aline Sax, Belgian children's writer
- Aline Silva (born 1979), Brazilian handball player
- Aline Sleutjes, Brazilian politician
- Aline Terry, American tennis champion at the end of the 19th century
- Aline Towne (1919–1996), American actress
- Aline Trede, Swiss politician
- Aline Valangin, Swiss psychoanalyst
- Aline Valek, Brazilian writer
- Aline Valette (1850–1899), French women's rights campaigner
- Aline Villares (born 1989), Brazilian footballer
- Aline Waites, English actress and writer
- Aline Weber (born 1989), Brazilian model
- Aline Wirley (born 1981), Brazilian actress and singer-songwriter
- Aline Wong, Singaporean sociologist and politician
- Aline A. Yamashita, Guamanian educator and politician
- Aline Zeler (born 1983), Belgian footballer
- Aline Zylberajch, French musician, musicologist, and educator

== Fictional characters ==
- A title character of Aline and Valcour, a 1795 epistolary novel by the Marquis de Sade
- Aline, a character in Watchmen
- Aline Penhallow, from The Shadowhunter Chronicles by Cassandra Clare
- The title character of the 1895 novelette The Princess Aline by Richard Harding Davis
- Aline, the title character of a eponymous comic strip by Adão Iturrusgarai
- Aline Dessendre, the secondary antagonist of Clair Obscur: Expedition 33

== Other ==
- The name given to a mummy found in the Tomb of Aline
- Aline (film), a 2021 French-Canadian drama film

== See also ==
- Aline (disambiguation)
- Alina, a given name
