= Ehrlich =

Ehrlich is a German/Yiddish surname, meaning "honest" or "honorable". Notable people with the surname Ehrlich or Erlich include:

== Ehrlich ==
- Abel Ehrlich (1915–2003), Israeli composer
- Aline Ehrlich (1928–1991), German-born Israeli biologist
- Alojzy Ehrlich (1914–1992), Polish table tennis player
- Anne H. Ehrlich (born 1933), American author of books on overpopulation and ecology
- Arnold Ehrlich (1848–1919), American biblical and rabbinical scholar
- Cristina Ehrlich, American fashion stylist
- Dieter Ehrlich (born 1941), German field hockey player
- Eugen Ehrlich (1862–1922), Austrian legal scholar
- Eugene Ehrlich (1922–2008), American lexicographer and author
- Felix Ehrlich (1877–1942), German chemist and biochemist
- Franz Ehrlich (1907–1984), German architect
- Gertrude Ehrlich (1923–2025), Austrian-American mathematician
- Georg Ehrlich (1897–1966), Austrian-born sculptor
- Gretel Ehrlich (born 1946), American travel writer
- Howard J. Ehrlich, American sociologist and anarchist activist
- Isaac Ehrlich, Israeli-American economist
- Jacques Ehrlich, (1893–1953), World War I flying ace
- Jake Ehrlich, (1900–1971), American attorney and author who was the model for Perry Mason and Sam Benedict
- Jakob Ehrlich (1877–1938), Austrian Zionist Holocaust victim
- Jon Ehrlich, American television and film composer
- Jonathan Erlich (born 1977), Israeli tennis player
- Joseph Ehrlich (1914–2003), founder of EMC Motorcycles, a British motorcycle manufacturer
- Kendel Ehrlich (born 1961), first lady of Maryland
- Lambert Ehrlich (1878–1942), Slovene Roman Catholic priest, politician, and ethnologist
- Marty Ehrlich (born 1955), American jazz musician
- Max Ehrlich (1892–1944), German actor, screenwriter and director
- Meshullam Ehrlich (1818–1861), Polish-Jewish philologist
- Paul Ehrlich (1854–1915), German scientist, Nobel Prize in Physiology or Medicine
- Paul R. Ehrlich (1932–2026), American biologist
- Ricardo Ehrlich (born 1948), Uruguayan politician
- Robert Ehrlich (born 1957), American politician
- Robert Ehrlich (physicist) (born 1938)
- Rotem Erlich (born 1969), Israeli basketball player
- Simon M. Ehrlich (1852–1895), American lawyer and judge
- S. Paul Ehrlich Jr. (1937–2005), American Surgeon General
- Stanisław Ehrlich (1907–1997), jurist
- Steven Ehrlich (born 1946), American architect
- Thomas Ehrlich (born 1934) American academic
- Walter Ehrlich (1896–1968), German philosopher
- William Ehrlich (1894–1923), German Nazi who was killed in the failed 1923 Beer Hall Putsch
- Yakov Ehrlich (born 1988), Russian football coach and former player
- Yom-Tov Ehrlich (1914–1990), American musician

== Erlich ==
- Dennis Erlich, American Scientologist
- Esther Erlich, Australian artist
- Jonathan Erlich (born 1977), Israeli tennis player
- Leandro Erlich, Argentine conceptual artist
- Paul Erlich (born 1972), American music theorist

== See also ==
- Madeleine Hunt-Ehrlich (born 1987), American artist and filmmaker
- Ehrich (disambiguation), a similarly spelled surname
- Erlick, a surname
