= Ehrich =

Ehrich is a surname. It may refer to:

- Elsa Ehrich (1914–1948), German Nazi SS concentration camp guard executed for war crimes
- Emil Ehrich (died 1887), German metalworker and businessman; co-founder of Ehrich & Graetz
- Hans Ehrich (born 1942), Swedish industrial designer and businessman
- Jochen H.H. Ehrich (born 1946), German pediatrician, tropical physician, nephrologist, and professor
- Louis R. Ehrich (1849–1911), American businessman, art dealer, and politician
- Maria Ehrich (born 1993), German actress
- Max Ehrich (born c.1991), American actor, singer, and dancer
- William Ernst Ehrich (1897–1960), German-born American sculptor, ceramicist, educator, and WPA supervisor

== See also ==
- Ehrlich (disambiguation), a similarly spelled surname
- Harry Houdini (a.k.a. Ehrich Weiss, among other names; 1874–1926), Hungarian-born American illusionist and stunt performer
