= Alaux =

Alaux is a surname. Notable people with the surname include,

- Aline Alaux (1813–1856), French artist
- Fanny Alaux (1797–1880), French painter
- Jean Alaux (1786–1864), French artist
- Jean-Paul Alaux (1788–1858), French landscape painter
- Michel Alaux (1924–1974), French-American fencing master
