= Helg =

Helg is a European surname. Notable people with the surname include:

- Aline Helg, Swiss historian
- Simon Helg (born 1990), Swedish footballer
- Beatrice Helg (born 1956), Swiss photographer
- Franca Helg (1920–1989), Italian designer and architect
