= Aline Reese Blondner =

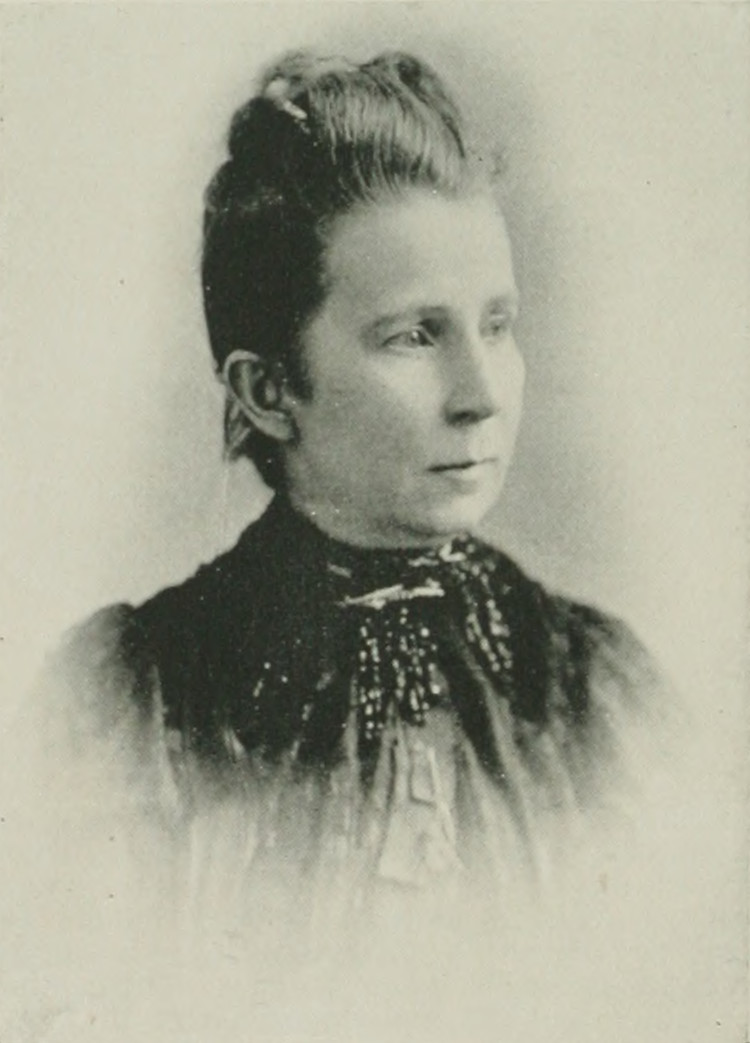
- "A Woman of the Century"

Background information
- Born: Aline Reese; April 29, 1841; Coweta County, Georgia
- Died: June 29, 1931 (aged 90) Nashville, Tennessee, U.S.
- Occupations: musician; music educator
- Instruments: piano; organ

Aline Reese Blondner (April 29, 1841 – June 29, 1931) was an American musician and music educator. Widely known as pianist, organist and teacher, she trained with Asger Hamerik, Carl Reinecke, and Franz Liszt, and performed with the Cincinnati Symphony Orchestra and the New York Philharmonic Orchestra.

== Early life and education ==
Aline (sometimes spelled, "Alline") Reese was born in Coweta County, Georgia, April 29, 1841. Her father was Rev. Augustus Reese, the son of a wealthy planter of southern Georgia; he was a graduate of Oxford College. Her mother was Celeste Dewel Reese, who was born in the Adirondack Mountains; she was educated in Troy Female Seminary, Troy, New York.

She received a classical education from her father. Her first musical instruction was given to her by her mother. They were both well-known educators.

With quick memorization, Aline played the piano at first sight at the age of eight. As a young child, she appeared in many public exhibitions, playing piano compositions which required technical skill and ability. She received further musical education from Prof. George Briggs on piano, violin and guitar, and on the organ from Prof. Charles Blondner, of Philadelphia. In 1878, she took lessons from Prof. Asger Hamerik, of Baltimore. In 1879, she went to Leipzig, Germany, where she took private lessons from Carl Reinecke for two years. In the summer of 1881, she went to Weimar, where Franz Liszt received her as a pupil.

== Career ==
Blondner played many concertos at the various musical festivals in Nashville, Tennessee, including Opus 11 in E Flat, piano and orchestra (Ludwig van Beethoven). With the Cincinnati Symphony Orchestra, she performed the concerto for piano, G Minor (Felix Mendelssohn). Both of these were under the direction of Prof. John A. Brookhaven. Again with the Cincinnati Orchestra, she played the quintet for piano and wind instruments, Opus 16 (Beethoven). At the Centennial Musical Congress, she played the Polish Fantasy by Ignacy Jan Paderewski (orchestral parts on second piano). With the New York Philharmonic Orchestra, she played the concerto, C Minor, Opus 185 (Joachim Raff) (director, Walter Damrosch).

Blondner taught in her own studio in Nashville, and in the Nashville College for Young Ladies. Her study of Richard Wagner's music drama, Der Ring des Nibelungen," was thorough, and she lectured on the subject for two years in her Wagner Classes. Another topic was, "Analysis of Forms as Displayed in Beethoven's Sonatas", At her studio, in 1906, she formed a Edward MacDowell club for the study of the music of that composer; recitals were interspersed with talks explaining each composition. The biography, Edward MacDowell: His Work and Ideals, by Elizabeth Fry Page was dedicated to Blondner.

She was organist in the city's First Baptist Church.

== Personal life ==
Miss Reese married Prof. Blondner, a music teacher of Germany. When widowed, she removed to Nashville with their young child.

She was in Europe twice, having traveled in Switzerland and spent some time in Antwerp and Paris.

Characterized as "always erratic", Blondner's mental health began to decline about 1910. She spent her later life at Nashville's City View Sanatarium where she died June 29, 1931. Blondner was buried at Mount Olivet Cemetery.
