= Aline Heitaa-Archier =

French Polynesian educator and advocate

Aline Titiehu Heitaa-Archier (born 28 June 1961) is a French Polynesian educator and advocate of the Marquesan language.

Heitaa-Archier is from the village of Puamau, on Hiva Oa in the Marquesas Islands. She was educated at Saint-Anne de Atuona school, and then at Collège La Mennais in Tahiti. After working for the Banque de Tahiti, she trained as a teacher, then returned to the Marquesas to teach, then became an education inspector. In August 2018 she was appointed as the national education inspector in charge of the Marquesas. In that role she has worked with the Marquesan Academy to boost the teaching of the Marquesan language.

In 2010 she was made a knight of the Ordre des Palmes académiques. In 2015 she was promoted to officer. In September 2023 she was made a knight of the Ordre national du Mérite.
