= Erlick =

Erlick is a surname. It could be referring to:

- Eli Erlick (born 1995), American activist and writer
- Myles Erlick (born 1998), Canadian actor, dancer and singer
- Nikki Erlick, American writer

== See also ==
- Ehrlich, another surname
