= Cristina Ehrlich =

American fashion stylist

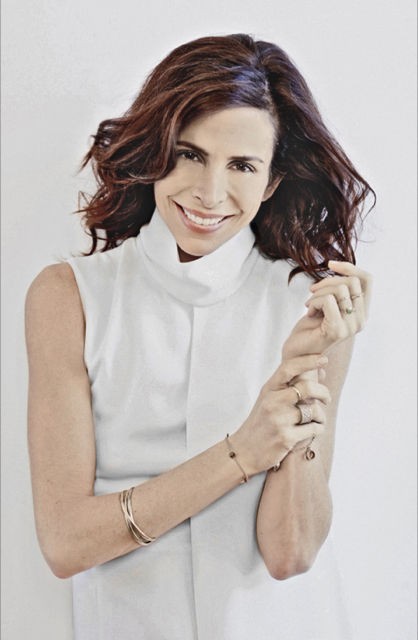
- Born: New York
- Education: New York University
- Occupation: Stylist

Cristina Ehrlich is an American fashion stylist. She has been listed as one of the 25 most powerful stylists by the Hollywood Reporter six times. Ehrlich was named "Celebrity Stylist of the Year" in 2012 at New York Fashion Week's Style Awards, received a Marie Claire Image Maker Award in 2017 and the DIFF Impact In Fashion Award in 2019.

== Early life ==
Born in New York City and raised in Los Angeles, Ehrlich is the daughter of surgeon and photographer, Dr. Richard M. Ehrlich and an interior designer and model mother. She attended New York University where she obtained her Bachelor's and Master's degrees in Fine Arts.

== Education and career ==
Cristina Ehrlich graduated from NYU and traveled to Europe to continue her dance studies and eventually returned to Los Angeles. She danced professionally until the age of 27, and retired to pursue her other love, fashion.

== Career ==
Ehrlich's styling career began with television commercials and advertising, leading quickly to feature films. Her clients have included Greta Gerwig, Jane Fonda, Christina Ricci, Penélope Cruz, Tina Fey, Natasha Lyonne, Allison Williams, Emma Thomas, Christine Baranski, Margot Robbie, Priyanka Chopra, Brie Larson, Lena Dunham, Hannah Waddingham, Connie Britton, Julia Louis Dreyfus, Mandy Moore, Betty Gilpin Phillipa Soo and Taylor Schilling. She has been featured in fashion industry panel discussions including the 2016 E! Style Collective and a 2017 collaboration between the Council of Fashion Designers of America and The Wall Group. She continues to style advertising campaigns for Fortune 500 companies which are featured regularly in major publications. Ehrlich has also been the subject of portrait series and articles in Town & Country, Vanity Fair and CIIN Magazine.

In 2016, Ehrlich styled actress Brie Larson for her appearance at the Academy Awards, Golden Globe Awards and SAG Awards where she won Best Actress at all three.

In 2019, Ehrlich co-launched T-shirt Brand with L.A. fashion designer Cheyann Benedict.
