= Aline Rougier =

French scientist

- Education: University of Bordeaux
- Scientific career
- Workplaces: Institute of Condensed Matter Chemistry of Bordeaux
- Thesis: Relation entre la structure et le comportement électrochimique des phases Li_{x}Ni_{1}-yMyO_{2}(M=Al, Fe, Co) : matériaux d'électrodes positives pour batteries au lithium (1995)
- Doctoral advisor: Claude Delmas

Aline Rougier is a French scientist in the field of solid state chemistry and materials science.

== Biography ==
Rougier was born in 1968. She completed her PhD in 1995 under the supervision of Claude Delmas at University of Bordeaux, before completing two post-docs in battery materials.

She has been an editor of Solar Energy Materials & Solar Cells since 2011.

She was previously Director of Research at Laboratoire de Réactivité et Chimie des Solides.

Her work appeared on the cover of Journal of Materials Chemistry C in 2020.

== Selected publications ==
- Rougier, A.; Gravereau, P.; Delmas, C. (1 April 1996). "Optimization of the Composition of the Li1 − z Ni1 + z O 2 Electrode Materials: Structural, Magnetic, and Electrochemical Studies". Journal of the Electrochemical Society. 143 (4): 1168–1175. Bibcode:1996JElS..143.1168R. doi:10.1149/1.1836614.
- Rougier, A (September 1996). "Effect of cobalt substitution on cationic distribution in LiNi1 − y CoyO2 electrode materials". Solid State Ionics. 90 (1–4): 83–90. doi:10.1016/S0167-2738(96)00370-0.
- Oumellal, Y.; Rougier, A.; Nazri, G. A.; Tarascon, J-M.; Aymard, L. (November 2008). "Metal hydrides for lithium-ion batteries". Nature Materials. 7 (11): 916–921. Bibcode:2008NatMa...7..916O. doi:10.1038/nmat2288. PMID 18849978.
- Delmas, C; Ménétrier, M; Croguennec, L; Saadoune, I; Rougier, A; Pouillerie, C; Prado, G; Grüne, M; Fournès, L (September 1999). "An overview of the Li(Ni,M)O2 systems: syntheses, structures and properties". Electrochimica Acta. 45 (1–2): 243–253. doi:10.1016/S0013-4686(99)00208-X.
