= Fanny Alaux =

French artist (1797–1880)

- Born: Françoise Virginie Liégeois; April 17, 1797; Paris, France
- Died: January 19, 1880; Paris

Fanny Alaux nee Françoise Virginie Liégeois (April 17, 1797 – January 19, 1880) was a French artist known for her painting and drawing.

== Biography ==
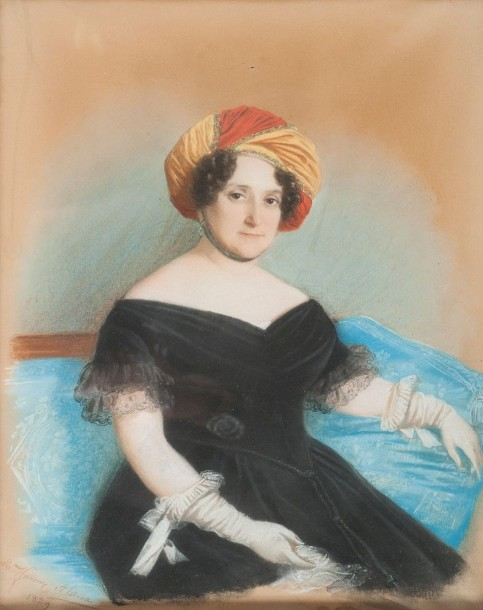
Portrait d'une femme au ruban (1839)

Alaux married the painter Jean Alaux, with whom she formed part of dynasty of Alaux painters. She showed in the Salons of 1839 to 1841. In 1841, she presented six pastel portraits.

== Works ==
United States

- French embassy, Washington: Marie-Antoinette-Thérèse, princesse des Asturies (1784-1806).

France

- Musée des Arts Décoratifs et du Design, Bordeaux :
  - Portrait de femme, 1839, pastel (inv. 58.1.952);
  - Portrait de Pierre-Simon Jullien, 1842, pastel (inv. 58.1.1004);
  - Portrait de Pauline Laurent, 1838, pastel (inv. 58.1.4354);
  - Portrait de Thermidor Laurent, 1842, pastel (inv. 58.1.4355).
- Musée de l'Histoire de France (Versailles) : Pierre-Antoine-Victor de Lanneau de Marey (1758-1830), commissioned by Louis-Philippe for the historical museum of Versailles in 1840.

Location unknown

- Portrait d'une femme au ruban, 1839, presumed work, portrait of de Madame Frédéric Louis Tattet (1768-1861).
