= Richard M. Ehrlich =

American photographer

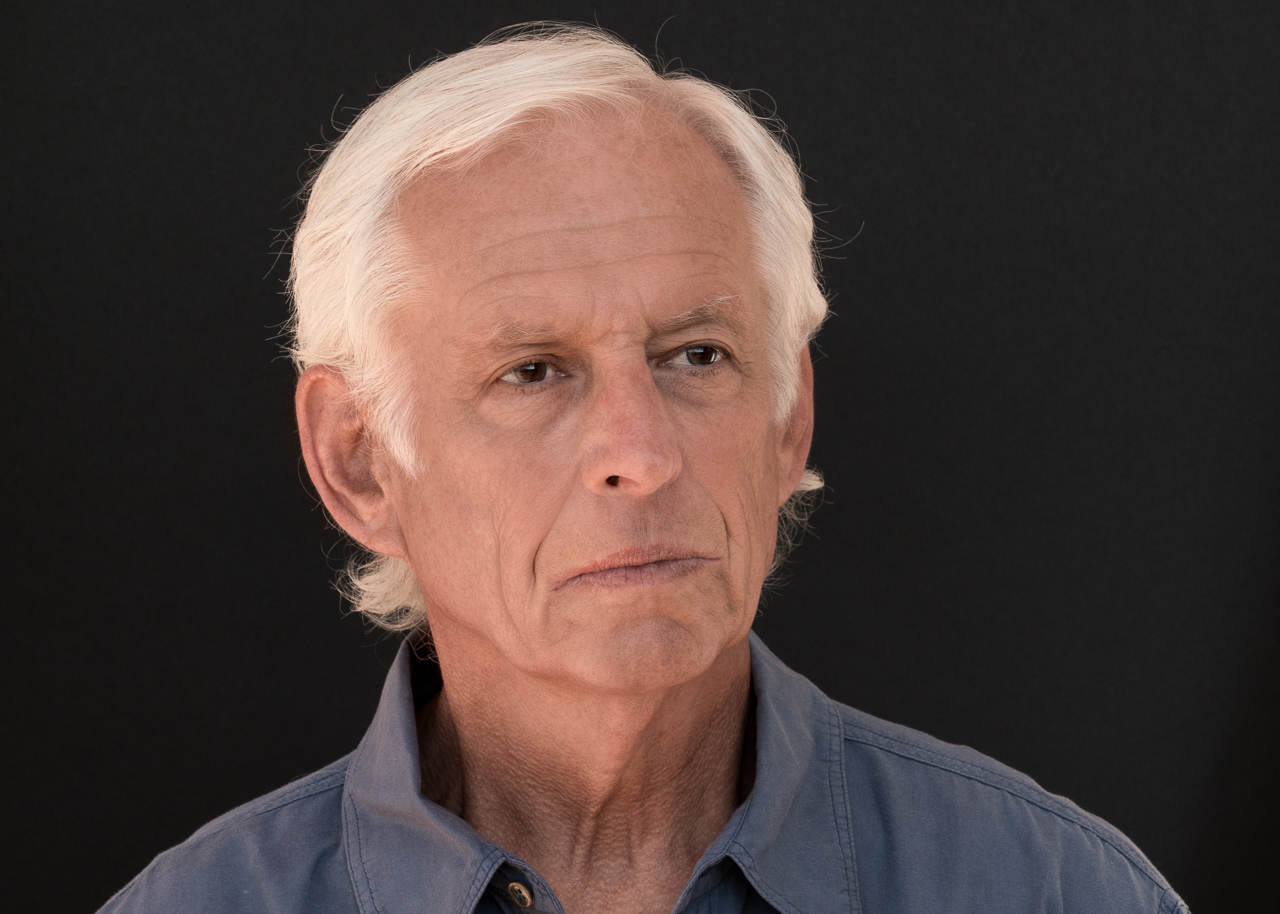
- Born: New York City
- Education: Cornell University (1959)
- Occupations: Urological surgeon, University of California Los Angeles Emeritus Professor; Fine Art photographer
- Years active: 1961-present

Richard M. Ehrlich is a surgeon and photographer. Born in New York City on March 12, 1938, he obtained a BA in 1959 from Cornell University, where he was a member of the Quill and Dagger society. He has been a professor and physician for over 40 years, and has been recognized as a fine art photographer. The New York Times said his photographs "suggest ephemerality from a broader historical perspective" and that they "look like staged fantasies".

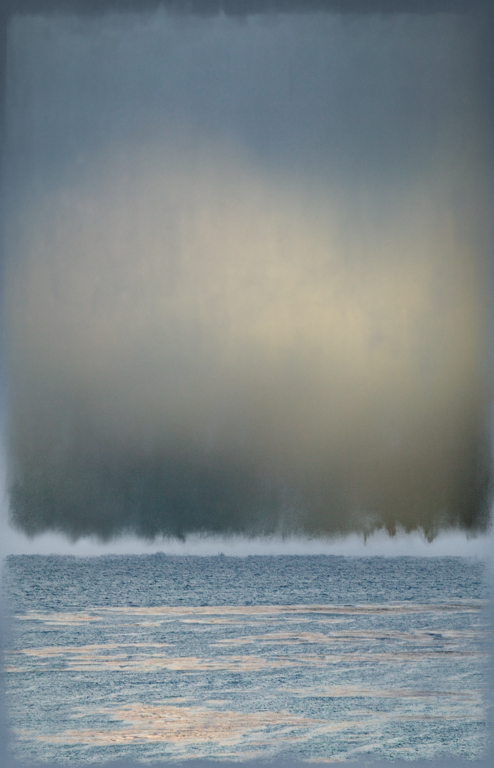
Homage to Rothko

== Career ==
In 1963, he obtained his medical degree from Cornell University Medical College, with an internship and surgical residency at the New York Hospital-Cornell Medical Center followed by a residency in urology at Columbia Presbyterian Medical Center from 1965 to 1969. He served as a Major in the United States Air Force from 1969 to 1971.

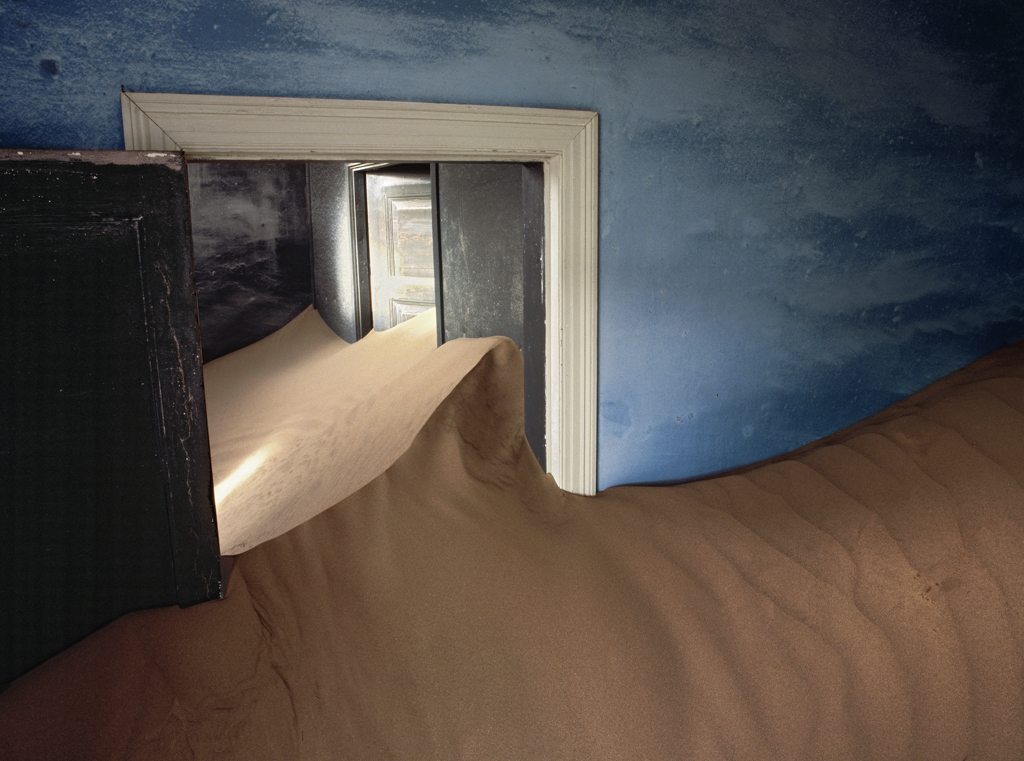
Forbidden Zone (Sperrgebiet) Namibia

He held a research Fellowship at the National Institute of Health sponsored by Columbia University in 1966-67 and a Senior Research Fellowship in 1969. He was admitted as a Fellow to the American College of Surgeons in 1974.

Ehrlich held multiple teaching positions at the University of California School of Medicine from 1971, becoming a Professor Emeritus of Urology in 2012. He is certified by the National Board of Medical Examiners and the American Board of Urology.

He served as President of both the Society for Pediatric Urology in 1991 and American Academy of Pediatrics-Urology Section in 1993, and was elected to membership in the American Association of Genitourinary Surgeons in 1982.

== Photography ==
Ehrlich is a professional fine art photographer whose photographs are held in permanent collections of multiple museums, including:

- J. Paul Getty Museum
- Smithsonian National Museum of American History
- Los Angeles County Museum of Art
- UCLA Hammer Museum
- The George Eastman Museum
- Denver Art Museum
- Santa Barbara Museum of Art
- United States Holocaust Memorial Museum
- Yad Vashem in Jerusalem
- Jewish Museum in New York City
- Jewish Museum, Berlin
- Musée d'Art et d'Histoire du Judaïsme, Paris
- Charles E. Young Research Library at University of California, Los Angeles
- University of Southern California Shoah Foundation
- Herbert F. Johnson Museum of Art, Cornell University, Ithaca
- Houston Museum of Fine Arts
- Museum of the City of New York
- Ruth Chandler Williamson Gallery Scripps College

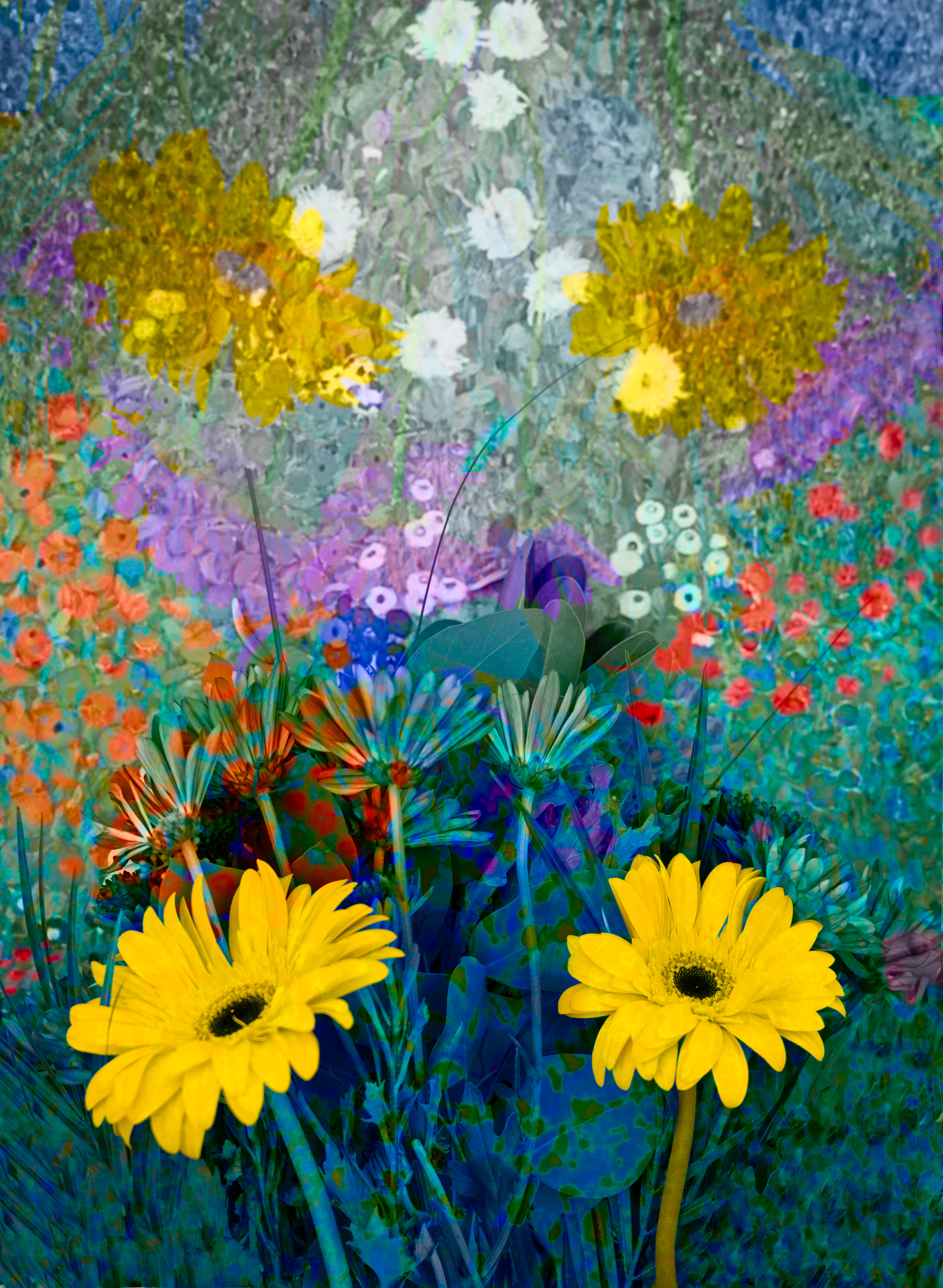
Floral Sublimity

His Holocaust Archives Series consists of photographs taken of the records of the International Tracing Service (ITS) in Bad Arolsen, Germany, an archival center that houses sources for identifying and tracing the victims of the Holocaust. He was the first to gain permission to photograph these archives. The series was shown at the Craig Krull Gallery in Santa Monica and at UCLA in 2008, and at the University at Buffalo in 2009, and was the subject of an LA Times article.

The Grammy Museum has featured Ehrlich's Face the Music exhibition. Expanding on the content of his 2016 photography book of the same title, it is the product of a five-year collaboration with a number of prominent musicians.

As a photographer, he has published twenty books and two portfolios including Namibia: The Forbidden Zone, Anatomia Digitale, The Other Side of the Sky, Reverie, Face the Music, Faces of Promise and Neogenesis. Decoding Mimbres Painting, for which he was a photographer, was named among the Best Art Books of 2018 by the New York Times.

In 2012 he delivered a lecture at Annenberg Space for Photography as part of the Iris Nights Lecture Series.

== Philanthropy ==
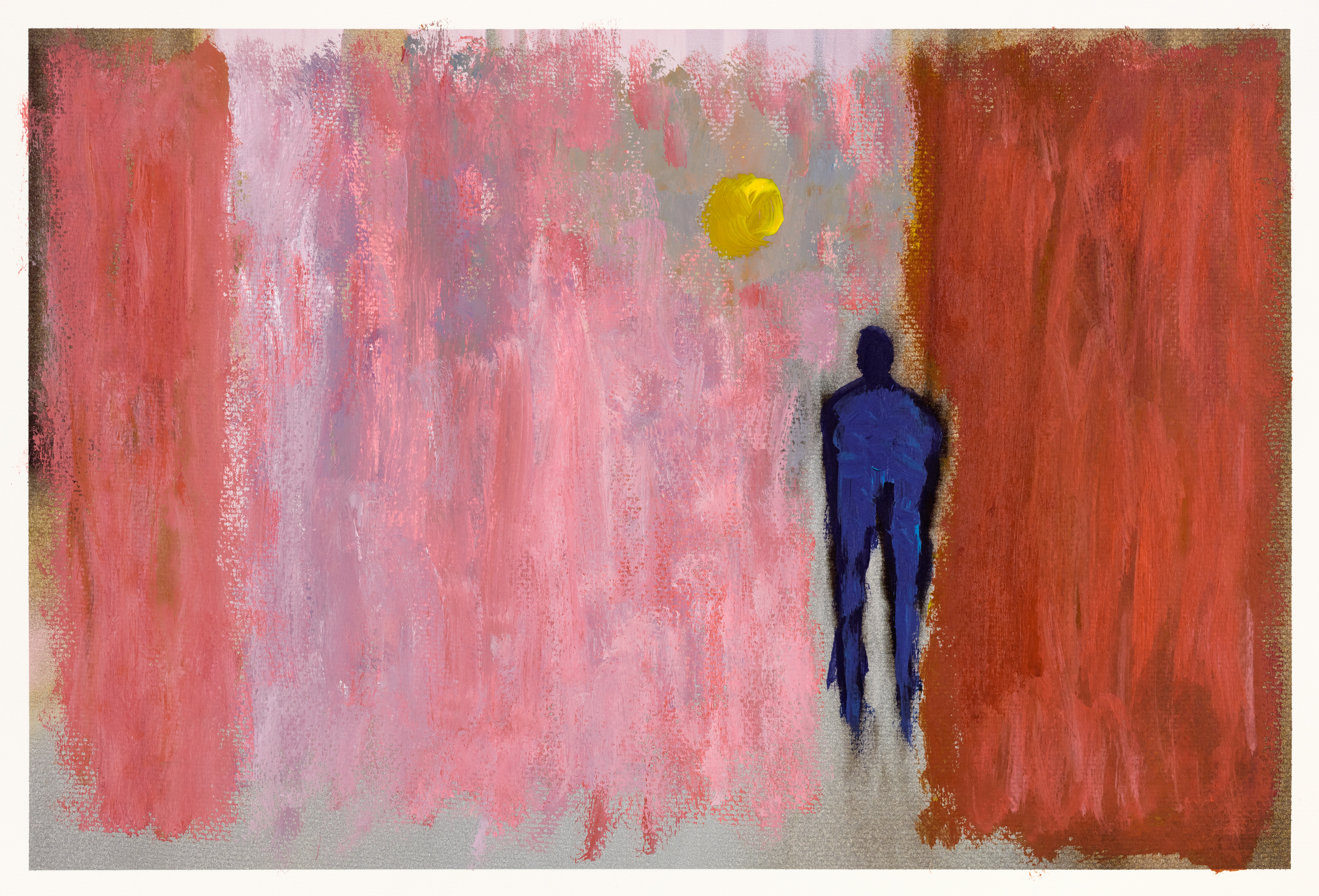
Windmills of My Mind

Ehrlich is president of Richard Ehrlich Family Foundation, a not-for-profit public charity under IRC Section 501(c)3 based in Malibu, CA. Beginning in 2016, the Foundation has facilitated a series of exhibitions compiling the works of Robert Frank, Robert Frank: Books and Films, 1947 - 2017, produced by Steidl. The exhibit has been shown at Tisch School of the Arts, at New York University, University of California, Los Angeles in collaboration with Bergamot Station, University of California, Berkeley, The Tisch Library at Tufts University, Houston Center for Photography and Blue Sky Gallery in Portland, Oregon.

His 2019 Rose Gallery exhibition, 27 Miles: Abstract Truth documenting the 2018 Woolsey fire, was presented to raise awareness and support for the California Community Foundation's Wildfire Relief Fund.

== Selected publications ==
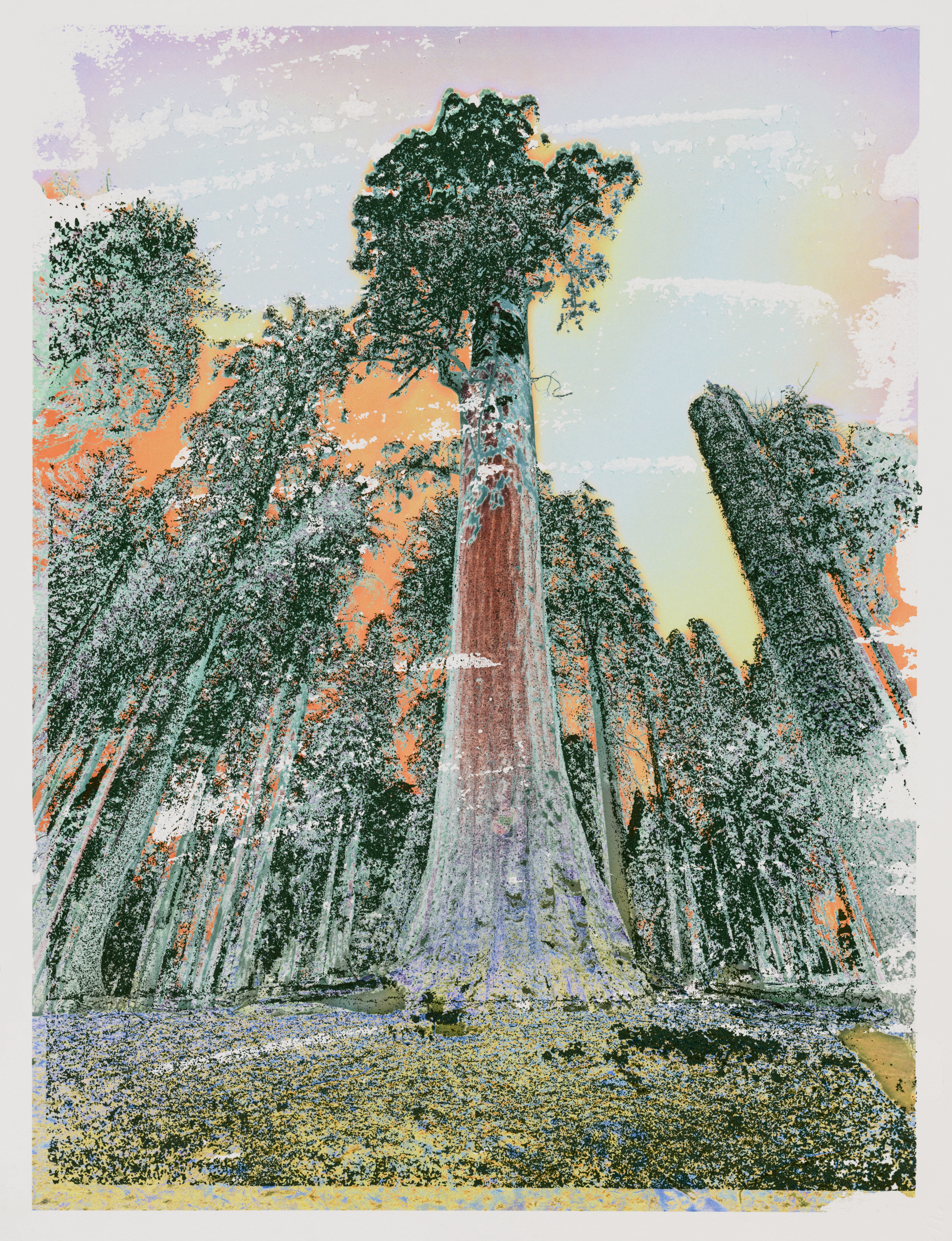
Sequoia Reimagined

=== Medical articles ===
- Smith, R.B., et al. "Bilateral renal cell carcinoma and renal cell carcinoma in the solitary kidney." The Journal of Urology 132.3 (1984): 450–454.
- Rajfer, J., et al. "Hormonal therapy of cryptorchidism." New England Journal of Medicine 314.8 (1986): 466–470.
- Ehrlich, R. M. et al. "Laparoscopic Nephrectomy in a child: expanding horizons for laparoscopy in pediatric urology." Journal of Endourology 6.6 (1992): 463–465.
- Ehrlich, R.M., A. Gershman, and G. Fuchs. "Laparoscopic vesicoureteroplasty in children: initial case reports.” Urology 43.2 (1994): 255–261.
- Ehrlich, R.M., A. Gershman, and G. Fuchs. "Laparoscopic renal surgery in children." The Journal of Urology 151.3 (1994): 735–739.
- Lesavoy, M. A., et al. "Long-term follow-up of total abdominal wall reconstruction for prune belly syndrome." Plastic and Reconstructive Surgery 129.1 (2012): 104e-109e.

=== Medical books ===
- Smith R.B.H. and Ehrlich R.M.: Complications of Urologic Surgery: Prevention and Management, W.B. Saunders Company, Philadelphia, Pennsylvania, 1990.
- Reconstructive and Plastic Surgery of the External Genitalia: Adult and Pediatric. W.B. Saunders Company, Philadelphia, Pennsylvania, 1999.

=== Photography and art books ===
- Richard Ehrlich, Namibia: The Forbidden Zone, Nazraeli Press, Paso Robles, California, 2007.
- Richard Ehrlich, Anatomia Digitale, Nazraeli Press, Paso Robles, California, 2009.
- Richard Ehrlich, The Other Side of the Sky, Craig Krull Gallery, Santa Monica, California, 2014.
- Richard Ehrlich, Reverie, Craig Krull Gallery and Weston Gallery, San Francisco, California, 2015.
- Richard Ehrlich, Face the Music, Steidl, Göttingen, Germany, 2016.
- Richard Ehrlich, Faces of Promise: Looking Beyond Autism, Graphic Arts Books, Berkeley, California, 2017.
- Richard Ehrlich, Neogenesis Portfolio, Nazraeli Press, Paso Robles, California, 2017.
- Tony Berlant, Evan Maurer & Julia Burtenshaw, Decoding Mimbres Painting: Ancient Ceramics of the American Southwest, Prestel Publishing, Munich, 2018. (Ehrlich served as the photographer)
- Richard Ehrlich, What's Past Is Prologue: That Was Then, This Is Now, CDS Publications, Medford, Oregon, 2018.
- Richard Ehrlich, Surface Aria: Inside the Outside, CDS Publications, Medford, Oregon, 2018.
- Richard Ehrlich, Neogenesis Two, Edition One, Richmond, California, 2019.
- Richard Ehrlich, Out of the Fire: Abstract Truth, Edition One, Richmond, California, 2019.
- Richard Ehrlich, In Libris XI - Bibliophilia, CDS Publications, Medford, Oregon, 2020.
- Richard Ehrlich, Neogenesis Three, CDS Publications, Medford, Oregon, 2020.
- Richard Ehrlich, The Arolsen Holocaust Archive, Steidl, Göttingen, Germany, 2021.
- Richard Ehrlich, Homage to Rothko: Abstract Sublime, Edition One, Richmond, California, 2021.
- Richard Ehrlich, Ars Scientifica: What's the Big Idea?, CDS Publications, Medford, Oregon, 2022.
- Richard Ehrlich, Mark Making: Taking a Line for a Walk, Edition One, Richmond, California, 2022.
- Richard Ehrlich, Sequoia Reimagined, Edition One, Richmond, California, 2023
- Richard Ehrlich, One Picture Book Two #35: Namibia Redux, Nazraeli Press, Paso Robles, California, 2023
- Richard Ehrlich, Windmills of My Mind, Edition One, Richmond, California, 2024
- Richard Ehrlich, Floraphilia: Endless Forms Most Beautiful, Edition One, Richmond, California, 2024
- Richard Ehrlich and Tanner Ehrlich, Fire, Typecraft, Pasadena, California, 2026.
