= Walter Ehrlich =

German philosopher (1896–1968)

Walter Ehrlich (16 May 1896 in Berlin – 26 December 1968 in Bad Ragaz, Canton of St. Gallen, Switzerland) was a German philosopher.

== Biography ==
Walter Ehrlich was born on 16 May 1896 as the son of the merchant, Jakob Ehrlich, and his wife, Nina Ehrlich, née Flatow, in Berlin. He attended the Königlich Französisches Gymnasium (Royal French Gymnasium) in Berlin until Easter of 1914. After that, he studied mathematics and theoretical physics at the Technische Hochschule in Berlin-Charlottenburg. In 1915 he joined the military and participated in the eastern campaign until October 1915. During this time, he contracted a prolonged illness, which continued until the end of the summer of 1917. In October 1917 he enrolled in the University of Berlin to study philosophy and broke off his studies at the end of 1918. In Berlin, Ehrlich attended lectures by professors Ernst Cassirer, Max Dessoir, Benno Erdmann, Alois Riehl, Friedrich Julius Schmidt and Ernst Troeltsch. After February 1919, he began philosophical and literary studies as a regular student at the University of Heidelberg under Heinrich Maier, Heinrich Rickert, Hans Driesch, Karl Jaspers, Max von Waldberg, Friedrich Gundolf (Friedrich Leopold Gundelfinger), Friedrich Neumann and Leonardo Olschki (1885-1961). Heinrich Maier (1867-1933), a philosopher who taught at the University of Heidelberg from 1918 to 1922, stimulated and encouraged Ehrlich with his doctoral dissertation, which was titled Der Freiheitsbegriff bei Kant und Schopenhauer (1920) (The Concept of Freedom in Kant and Schopenhauer).

== Works by Walter Ehrlich ==
- Der Freiheitsbegriff bei Kant und Schopenhauer. (1920) (88 pages) (Doctoral dissertation, philosophical faculty of the University of Heidelberg - Heinrich Maier, advisor)
- Kant und Husserl. Kritik der transzendentalen und der phänomenologischen Methode. Halle Saale 1923. X, 166 pages.
- Metaphysik im erkenntniskritischen Grundriss. Philosophische Gespräche. Halle Saale 1924. 136 pages.
- Das unpersonale Erlebnis. Einführung in eine neue Erkenntnislehre. Halle Saale 1927. 264 pages.
- Stufen der Personalität. Grundlegung einer Metaphysik des Menschen. Halle Saale 1930. 166 pages.
- Intentionalität und Sinn. Halle Saale 1934. 48 pages.
- Grundzüge der Rechtsmetaphysik. Ein Vortrag. Halle Saale 1935. 52 pages.
- Der Sinn in der Geschichte. Einleitung in die Transzendentalgeschichte. Zurich (Switzerland) 1935. 42 pages.
- Das Verstehen. Zurich (Switzerland) 1939. 174 pages.
- Ontologie des Bewusstseins. Zurich (Switzerland) 1940. VIII, 320 pages.
- Der Mensch und die numinosen Regionen. Chur (Switzerland) 1943. 180 pages.
- Lehre vom Karman. Chur (Switzerland) 1945. 176 pages.
- Ästhetik. Chur (Switzerland) 1947. 100 pages.
- Soziologie. Chur (Switzerland) 1949. 100 pages.
- Geistesgeschichte. Tübingen 1952. 88 pages.
- Metaphysik. Tübingen 1955. 128 pages.
- Ethik. Tübingen 1956. 140 pages.
- Philosophische Anthropologie. Tübingen 1957. 124 pages.
- Einführung in die Staatsphilosophie. Tübingen 1958. 128 pages.
- Hauptprobleme der Wertphilosophie. Verlag Max Niemeyer. Tübingen 1959. 126 pages.
- Grundlinien einer Naturphilosophie. Tübingen 1960. 112 pages.
- Kulturgeschichtliche Autobiographie. Tübingen 1961. 112 pages.
- Aphorismen zur Philosophie der Kunst. Tübingen 1962. 112 pages.
- Kulturphilosophie. Tübingen 1964. 120 pages.
- Philosophie der Geschichte der Philosophie. Tübingen 1965. 116 pages.
- System der Philosophie. Tübingen 1966. 112 pages.
- Selbsterziehung und Pädagogik. Tübingen 1969. 112 pages.
