= Jean-Paul Alaux =

French landscape painter

Gentil
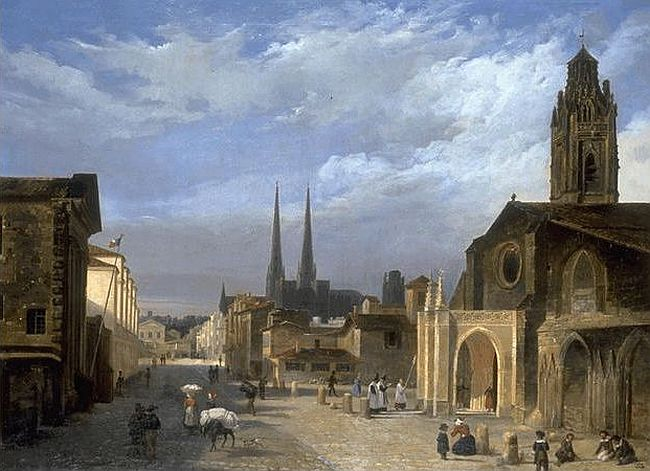
- Église Sainte-Eulalie de Bordeaux
- Born: Jean-Paul Alaux; 1788; Bordeaux, France
- Died: 24 January 1858 (aged 69–70); Bordeaux
- Occupations: Painter and lithographer
- Parent: Pierre-Joseph Alaux
- Relatives: Jean Alaux (brother)

Jean Paul Alaux (1788–1858), also known as Gentil, was a French landscape painter and lithographer born at Bordeaux on 4 October 1788. His father Pierre-Joseph Alaux was also an artist as were his two older brothers, Jean Alaux, who had the nickname of "the Roman", and Jean-Pierre Alaux (1783–1858).

A pupil of Pierre Lacour and Horace Vernet, he went on to teach at the Lycée de Bordeaux between 1807 and 1858. Later he became director of the School of Design at Bordeaux. View of Floirac was the first painted he exhibited at the Paris Salon in 1827; two years later, in 1831, his exhibit was View of Bordeaux Seen from Floirac; View of Bordeaux from the Saint Raphael Barracks to the Church of Saint Eulalia was displayed in 1833.

He died at Bordeaux on 24 January 1858.

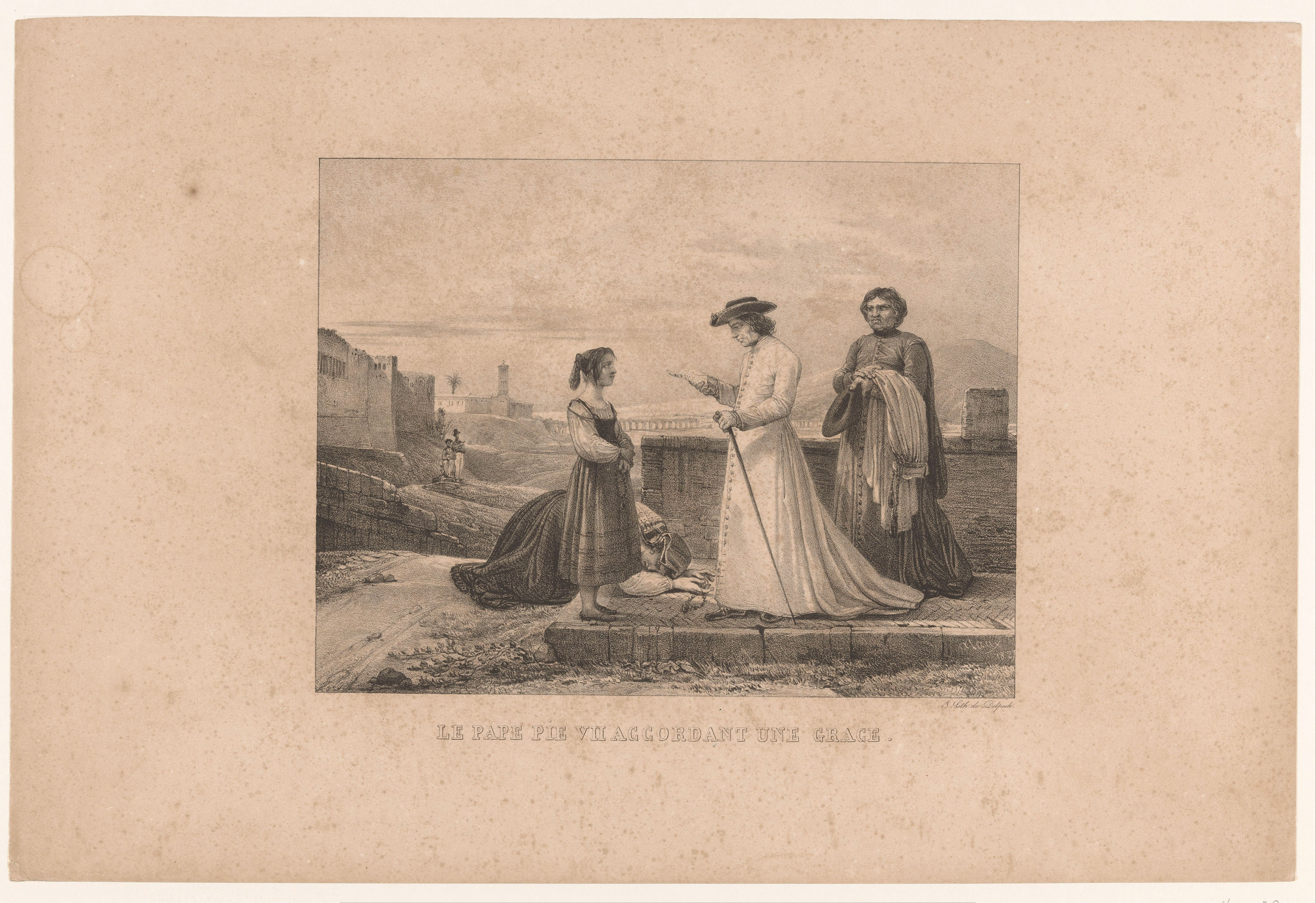
(Rijksmuseum)
