= Laurence Croguennec =

French chemist

Laurence Croguennec is a French chemist and electric battery inventor. She is a director of research for the French National Centre for Scientific Research (CNRS) and associate director of the Institute for Solid State Chemistry Bordeaux (ICMCB), a laboratory shared between CNRS and the University of Bordeaux.

== Research ==
Croguennec's research in solid-state chemistry and crystal chemistry focuses on materials for the electrodes of metal-ion batteries including lithium-ion batteries and sodium-ion batteries. This work included the development of an early prototype rechargeable sodium-ion battery with a layered oxide of sodium and titanium as its negative electrode, and has included the first transmission electron microscope images of individual lithium atoms.

== Education and career ==
Croguennec received a doctorate in 1996 from Nantes University, through research at the Institut des Matériaux de Nantes Jean Rouxel, a collaborative research institute of CNRS and Nantes University.

After postdoctoral research at the University of Bonn in Germany, she became a CNRS researcher in 1997, affiliated with ICMCB. She became the head of a research group on materials for batteries there in 2004.

== Recognition ==
Croguennec was a 2025 recipient of the CNRS Silver Medal. In 2025 the International Society of Electrochemistry gave her their ISE Prize for Electrochemical Energy Conversion and Storage of Division 3 in Honour of Bruno Scrosati, "for significant advancement of the understanding and development of lithium-, sodium-, and potassium-ion batteries, as well as all-solid-state systems with a strong focus on sustainability and future battery technologies".
