= Aline and Valcour =

1795 novel by the Marquis de Sade

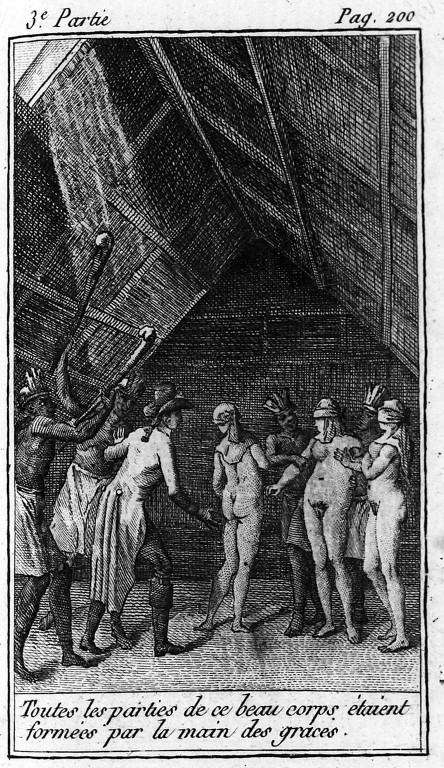
- "All the parts of this beautiful body were formed by the hand of the graces." Illustration from a 1795 edition of Aline et Valcour
- Author: Marquis de Sade
- Language: French
- Genre: Epistolary novel
- Publication date: 1795
- Publication place: France
- Media type: Print (Hardback & Paperback)

Aline et Valcour; ou, Le Roman philosophique is an epistolary novel by the Marquis de Sade. It contrasts a brutal African kingdom, Butua, with a South Pacific island paradise known as Tamoé and led by the philosopher-king Zamé.

Sade wrote the book while incarcerated in the Bastille in the 1780s. Published in 1795, it was the first of Sade's books published under his true name.

== Bibliography ==
The book was translated into English, German, Spanish and Japanese.

An essay titled "Observations on Aline and Valcour" by Alice Laborde appeared in the collection Sade, his ethics and rhetoric by Colette Verger Michael, New York 1989.

Blank darkness: Africanist discourse in French by Christopher L Miller (Chicago 1985) contains a chapter titled "No one's novel: Sade's Aline et Valcour".

== Plot and themes ==
Aline and Valcour are young lover's forced apart by Aline's sadistic and cruel father, President Balmont. He intends to marry her off to his equally sadistic friend monsieur Dolbourg. Balmont and Dolbourg both take pleasure in doing unpleasant things to young women and keeping them as sex slaves. Valcour and his friend Deterville are determined to uncover the truth about Balmont and Dolbourg, eventually leading to an attempt to rescue Aline and another captive Sophie. The book explores key themes of Virtue or vice, cruelty and pleasure, utopia and dystopian and autobiographical elements.
