= Aline Duval =

French actress

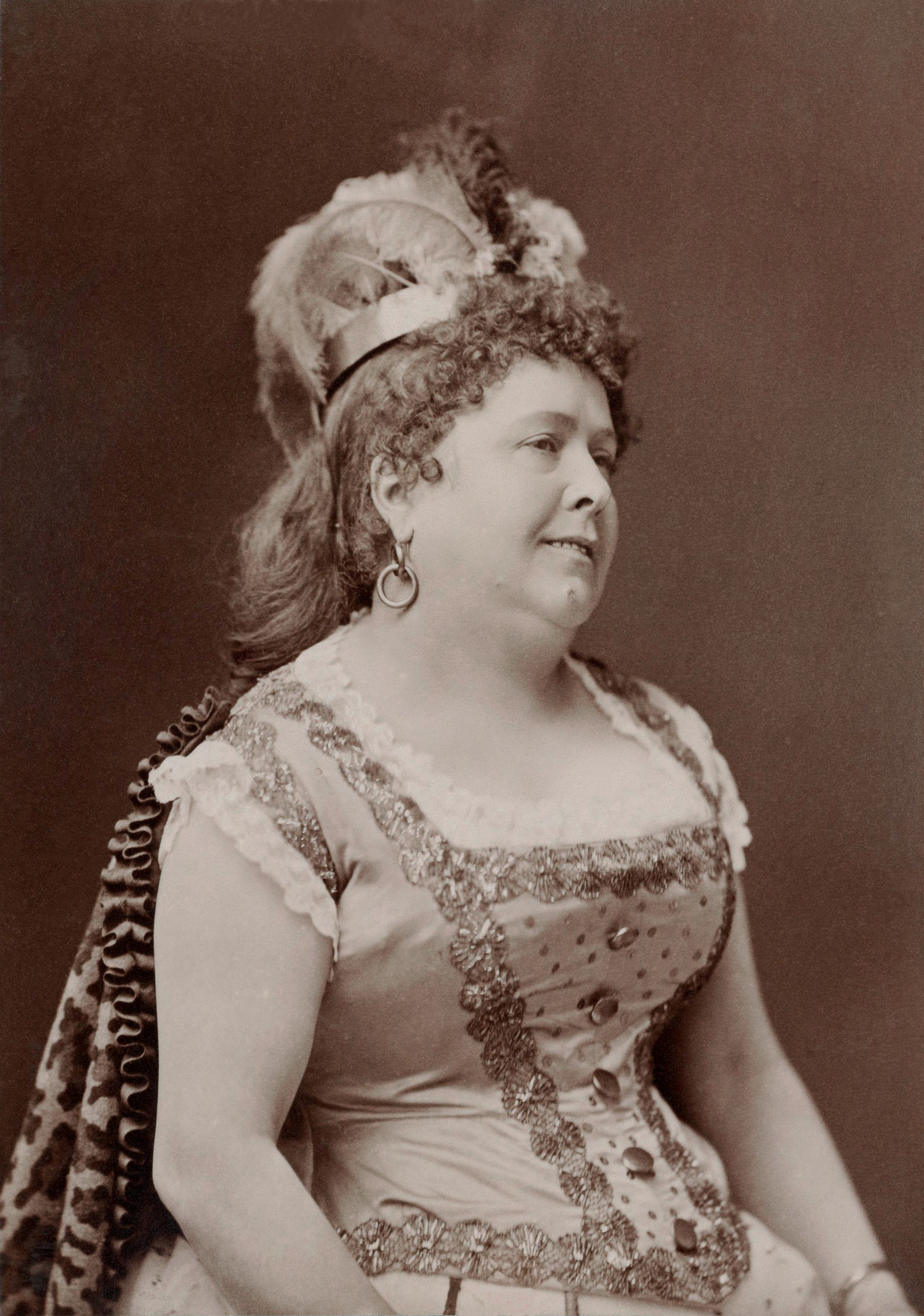
- Duval in 1888, in La princesse de Trébizonde at the Théâtre des Variétés (1888), photo by Nadar
- Born: Aline Louise Duval c. 1824; Paris
- Died: July 20, 1903
- Occupation: Actor
- Years active: 1842–1881

Aline Louise Duval (c. 1824 – July 20, 1903) was a French stage actress. "Much appreciated in the roles of travesties or grisettes thanks to the biting of her voice and her air of delicacy, she was also noticed in the reviews for her enthusiasm and her good humor."

She is buried in Père Lachaise Cemetery.

== Biography ==
Duval’s father worked as a plumber. She started acting as a child, at the Théâtre Comte, later at the Théâtre du Panthéon. Starting in 1842, she would spend the next 20 years at the Théâtre du Palais-Royal, before moving the Théâtre des Variétés in 1864, holding the job of duenna. In 1880, she was described as playing "the old women at the Variétés".

She is described in an 1858 Parisian stage biography as “an eccentric actress, but so daring to the art of pleasing”. She was much loved by the theatre-going public, even when she was in a bad play:

"Personally, I appreciate this excellent actress, and for good reason. I do not know of an equal in her role. Of an eminently artistic nature, a true actress, I could never express all the praise that she deserves. Her talent is frank and sincere; she knows how to charm with a rare security. Always under a surprising variety of appearance, she is inimitable of verve in her game and of fun in her attitude. It is to be hoped that this amusing actress remains a long time among us. Her disappearance would be those that one would be cruelly felt at the Boulevard Montmartre."

Duval died in 1903, in her late seventies.
