= Polish Fantasy (Paderewski) =

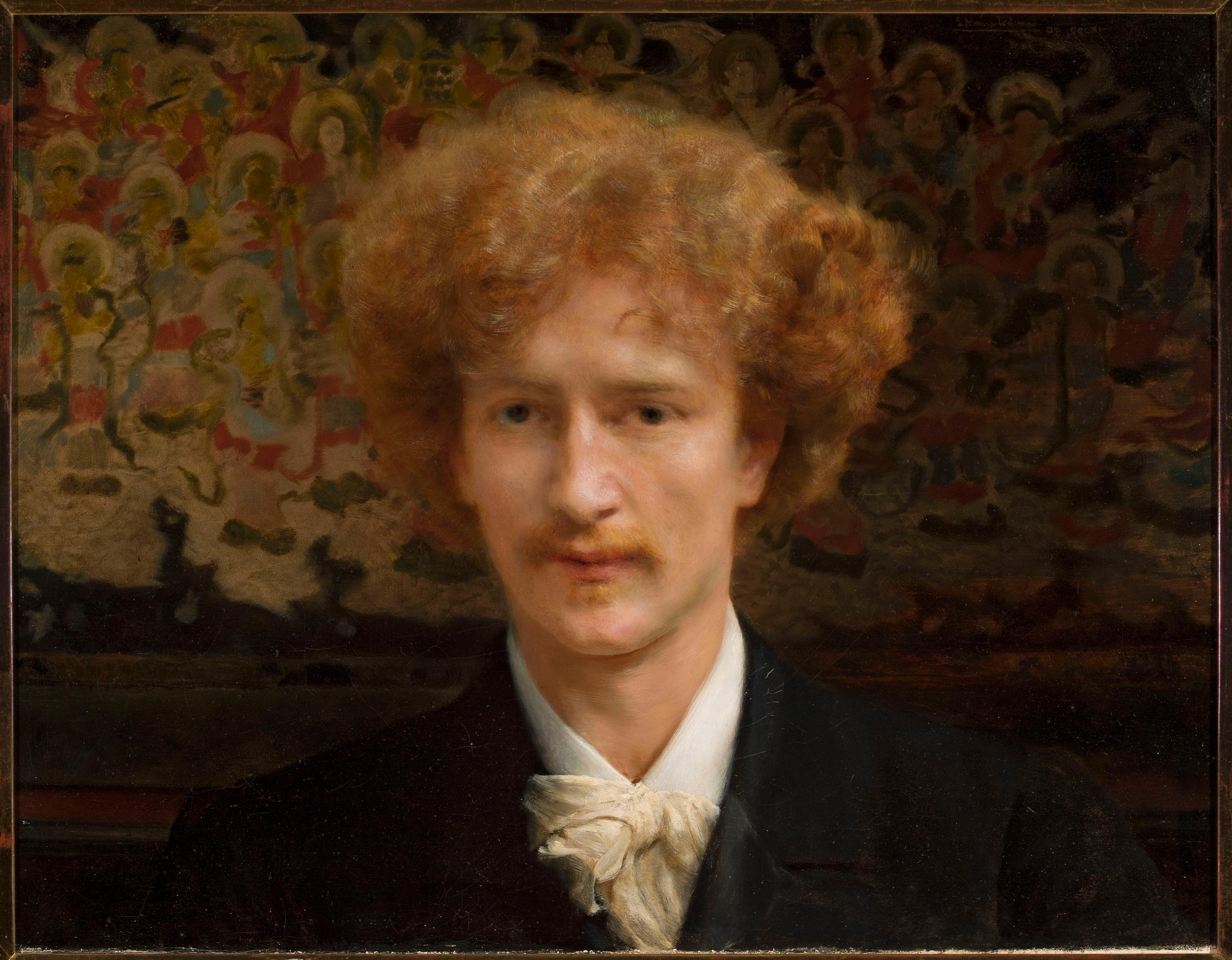
A portrait of Ignacy Jan Paderewski, by painter Lawrence Alma-Tadema, 1890

The Polish Fantasy in G♯ minor, Op.19 (French: Fantaisie polonaise sur des thèmes originaux), is a work for piano and orchestra composed in 1893 by Ignacy Jan Paderewski. It was first performed at the Norwich Festival in England the same year, where it achieved success and became a frequent addition to Paderewswki's concert repertoire. It is characterized by expressive themes, drawing influences from Polish folk music, and was often played by Paderewski at his concerts to remind audiences of the existence of then-occupied Poland.

The work was dedicated to Princess Rachel de Brancovan. A typical performance lasts around 21 minutes.

== Music ==
The piece is scored for solo piano, piccolo, 2 flutes, 2 oboes, English horn, 2 clarinets, 2 bassoons, 4 horns, 2 trumpets, 3 trombones, tuba, timpani, percussion, harp, and strings.

Although one piece, the Fantasy can be divided into four distinct movements:

1. Allegro moderato (G♯ minor)
2. Vivace non troppo, ma poi molto accelerando (C major)
3. Andante molto sostenuto (G♯ minor)
4. Allegro giocoso (A♭ major)

Throughout it, one can hear rhythms of numerous Polish folk dances, including those of an oberek, a krakowiak, and a modified polonaise in duple meter.
