= Tomb of Aline =

Ancient tomb from Roman Egypt

The Tomb of Aline is an ancient Egyptian grave from the time of Tiberius or Hadrian, excavated at Hawara in 1892.

== Find conditions, finds, date ==
In the second half of the 19th century, the increasing interest in Egyptian history, culture and art led to a veritable contest between various European nations, all aiming to secure ancient finds of the best possible quality (and quantity) for their national museums. In this general context, the German archaeologist Richard von Kaufmann undertook a short campaign of excavations at Hawara in March 1892; his most important find was the so-called Tomb of Aline. A shaft led to a simple mud-brick-lined pit of 2.8 by 3.5 m which contained eight mummies. Three were undecorated, two had paper masks and three were adorned with mummy portraits. The grave had no superstructure.

The three mummies with painted portraits lay at the bottom; they were those of the woman Aline and of two female children. The two masked mummies lay at right angles on top of them; they were those of a man and of a somewhat older girl. The two undecorated mummies, in turn, lay on top, again at right angles. On the mummies of the man, the woman and the three girls, the wrapping had been additionally secured with clay sealings, using different sealstones. One depicted Heracles fighting the Nemean lion, the others heads. Not all sealings are preserved. The grave goods included a clay pot with a spray of flowers, as is typical for such graves. There was also a roughly hewn stele bearing the following Greek inscription:

Greek

ΑΛΙΝΗΙ
Η ΚΑΙ ΤΈΝΩϹ
ΗΡΩΔΟΥ ΧΡΉC
ΤΗ ΧΑΙΡΕ ΠΟΛΛΑ
ΕΤΟΥϹ Ι ΛΕ Λ
ΜΕΣΟΡΉ Ζ

English

Aline
also called Tenos
daughter of Herodes
much loved
died in year 10, age 35 years
on the 7th of Mesore

The grave was named after this inscription. Scholarship assumes that Aline is the woman buried in the tomb and equipped with a mummy portrait. Further, it is believed that the man was her husband and the girls her daughters. As the ages and sexes of the undecorated mummies are not known, they cannot be similarly attributed. The separation of the date in the inscription in two parts, resulting from the insertion of Aline's age in the middle, is unusual. Since it was common in Roman Egypt to count the year from the accession of the current ruler, the grave can be dated, in conjunction with the portrait's hairstyle, quite securely to one of two possible dates. It is usually taken to be from the tenth year of the reign of Tiberius, i.e. 24 AD. The same hairstyle became popular once more a century later, so that the 10th year of Hadrian's reign (AD 107) is also a possibility, but most scholars prefer the earlier date. Further arguments in favour of the later date include the fine painting style and use of hatching, both typical of the 2nd century AD, the lilac tones of the garments, the depiction of the woman as rather well-fed, as well as the hair and beard of the man. It remains unclear when the mummies were deposited and whether all died within the same generation.

Today, the finds from the Grave are at the Egyptian Museum, Berlin. Part of them is on display in the Altes Museum.

== Mummy portraits and masks ==
=== Aline ===
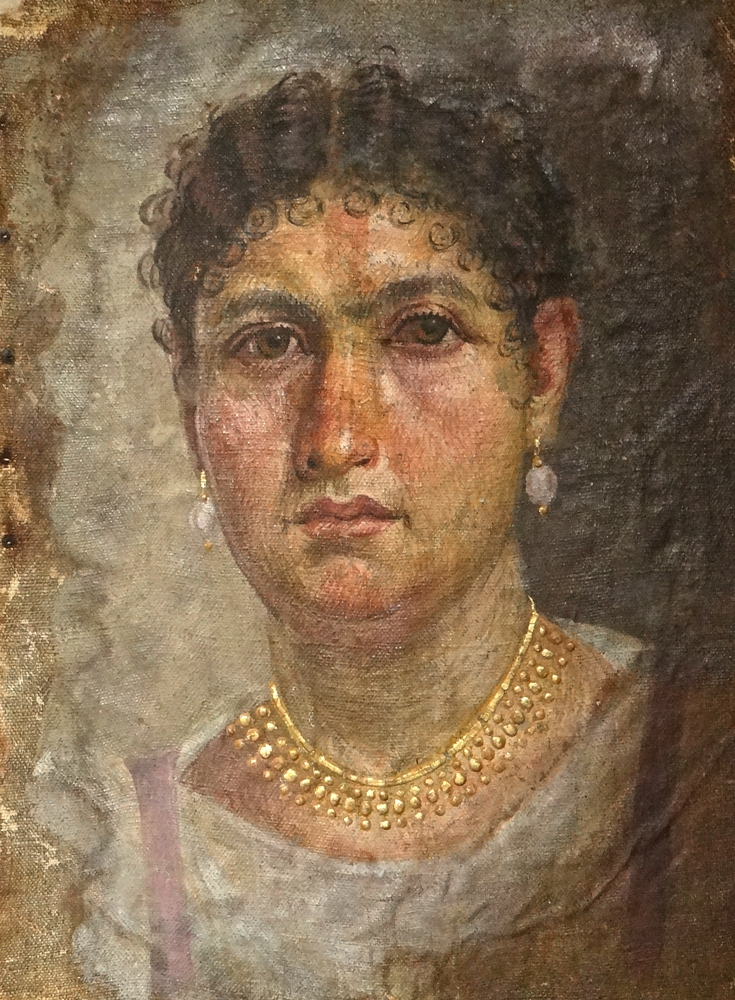
Portrait of Aline

The portrait of Aline was painted in tempera on linen, as were those of the two girls. It has a height of 40 cm and a width 32.5 cm. Below the painted cloth, scraps of linen pressed onto the mummy's face were used to provide an even surface, so that the portrait is nearly flat. Some of the portraits were painted before the death of their subject. Aline's portrait is painted directly on the end of the mummy wrapping and appears to have been produced after death, perhaps based on a previously prepared portrait. Like other mummy portraits, the painting appears three-dimensional and is front-facing, features of Graeco-Roman influences on Egyptian art. Aline wears a necklace, and a white tunica or chiton, thin lilac bands (clavus) run across her shoulder. The wistful gaze is typical of mummy portraits.

=== Children ===
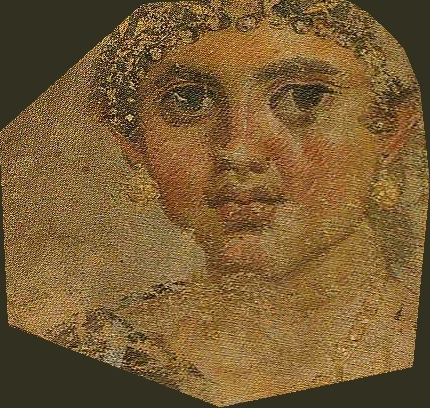
Portrait of the middle girl

The two mummies of the younger girls have not been unwrapped. In the early 1990s they were examined with modern techniques for the time. Since the portrait of the older girl is still attached to her mummy, it is less clearly visible at present; additionally, it has been attached somewhat too far to the right of the window-like opening in the wrapping. As with the other children and the man, her name is unknown. She wears valuable but simple jewellery and has a ringlet hairstyle. Her mummy was CT scanned, estimating her age at death to be between two and a half and four years old. This scan revealed she had an abscess or cellulitis in her lower left leg; treatment in the form of a dressing was applied to the area, the first of its kind documented from Ancient Egypt. This dressing is suggested to contain natron, a remedy for drying an inflamed wound given in the Edwin Smith Papyrus.

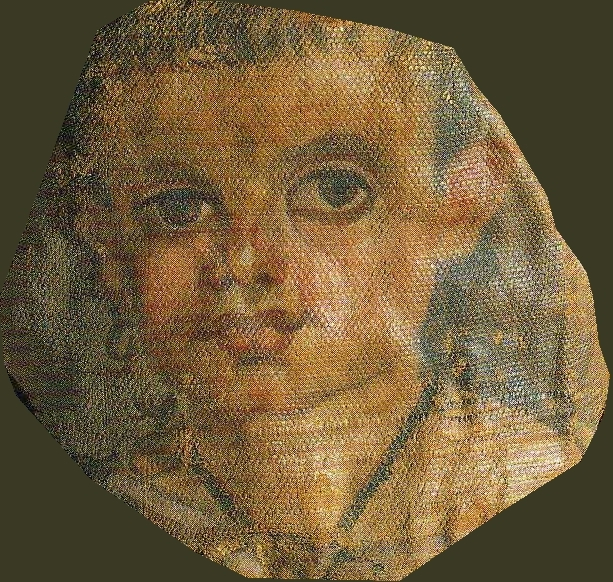
Portrait of the younger girl

For a long time, scholarship believed the portrait of the younger child to depict a boy. Recent research proves that the child is a girl. Around her neck is a leather band with a lunula pendant, an apotropaic amulet commonly worn by women or girls. Her chiton is violet in colour, a feature exclusive to females. The depiction of it exposing her left shoulder, an attribute of the goddess Aphrodite, aimed to underline erotic attraction. It is commonly used on the mummy portraits of women and even young girls. CT scanning of this child, referred to in the study as a boy, estimated an age at death of between two and three years old. This child showed evidence of septic arthritis of the right hip joint.

=== Paper masks ===
In contrast to the painted portraits, the paper masks were less concerned with depicting individuals. The mask of the male mummy is gilded. The find of the masks and portraits in the tomb shows that both forms of treating the dead did not only coexist at the same time, but could indeed be used by the same family in a single grave.

== Gallery ==
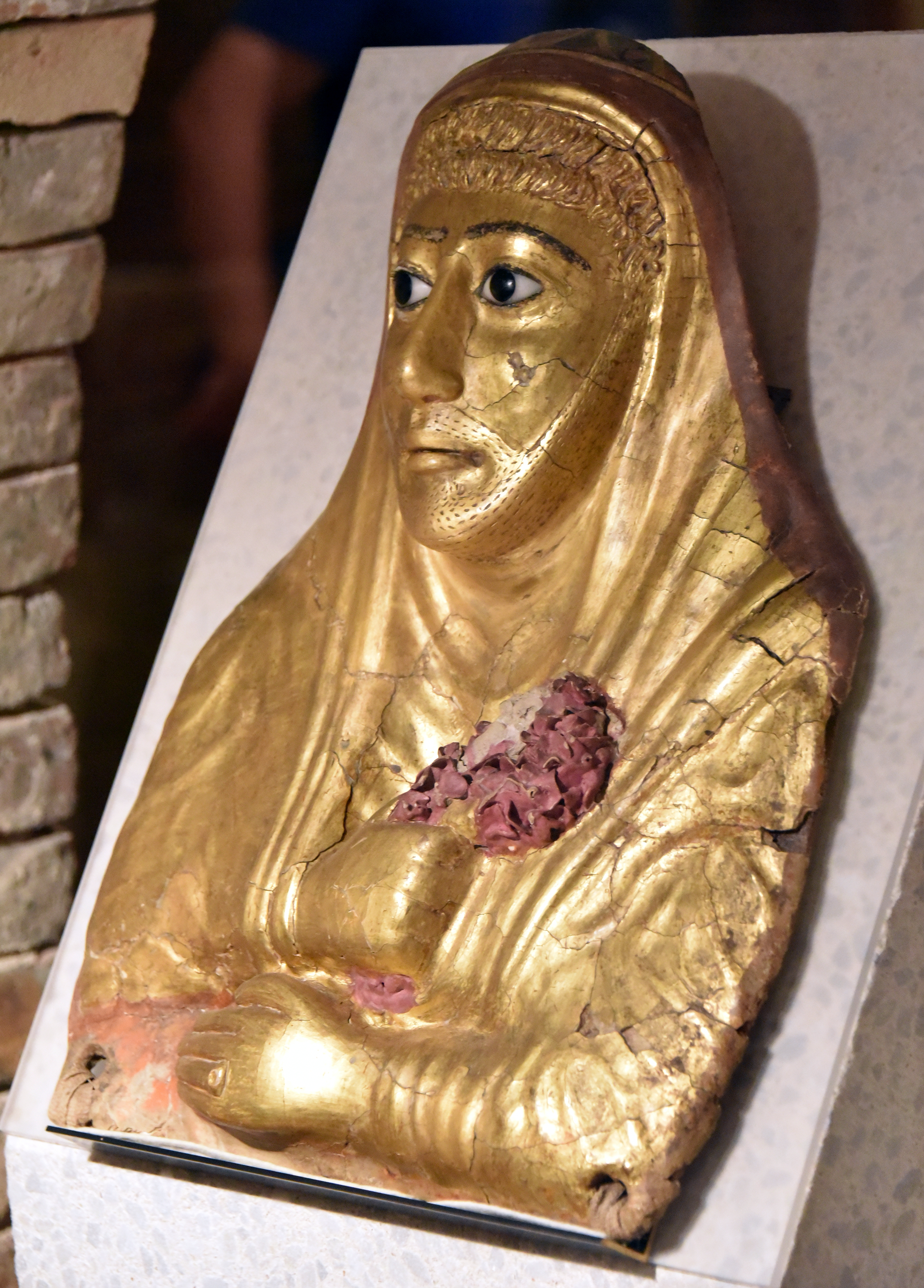
Mummy mask of Aline's husband

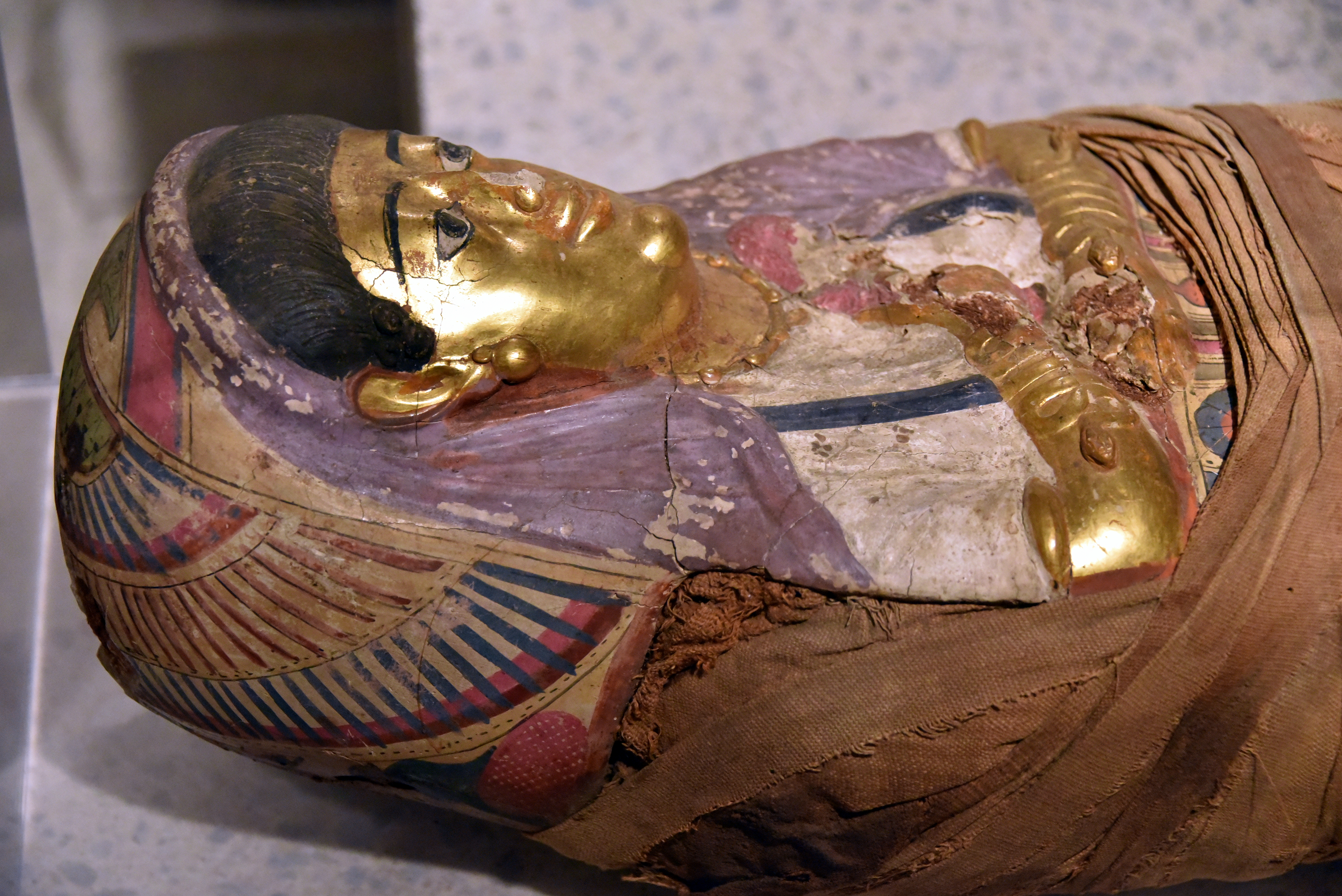
Mummy mask and coffin of one of Aline's daughters

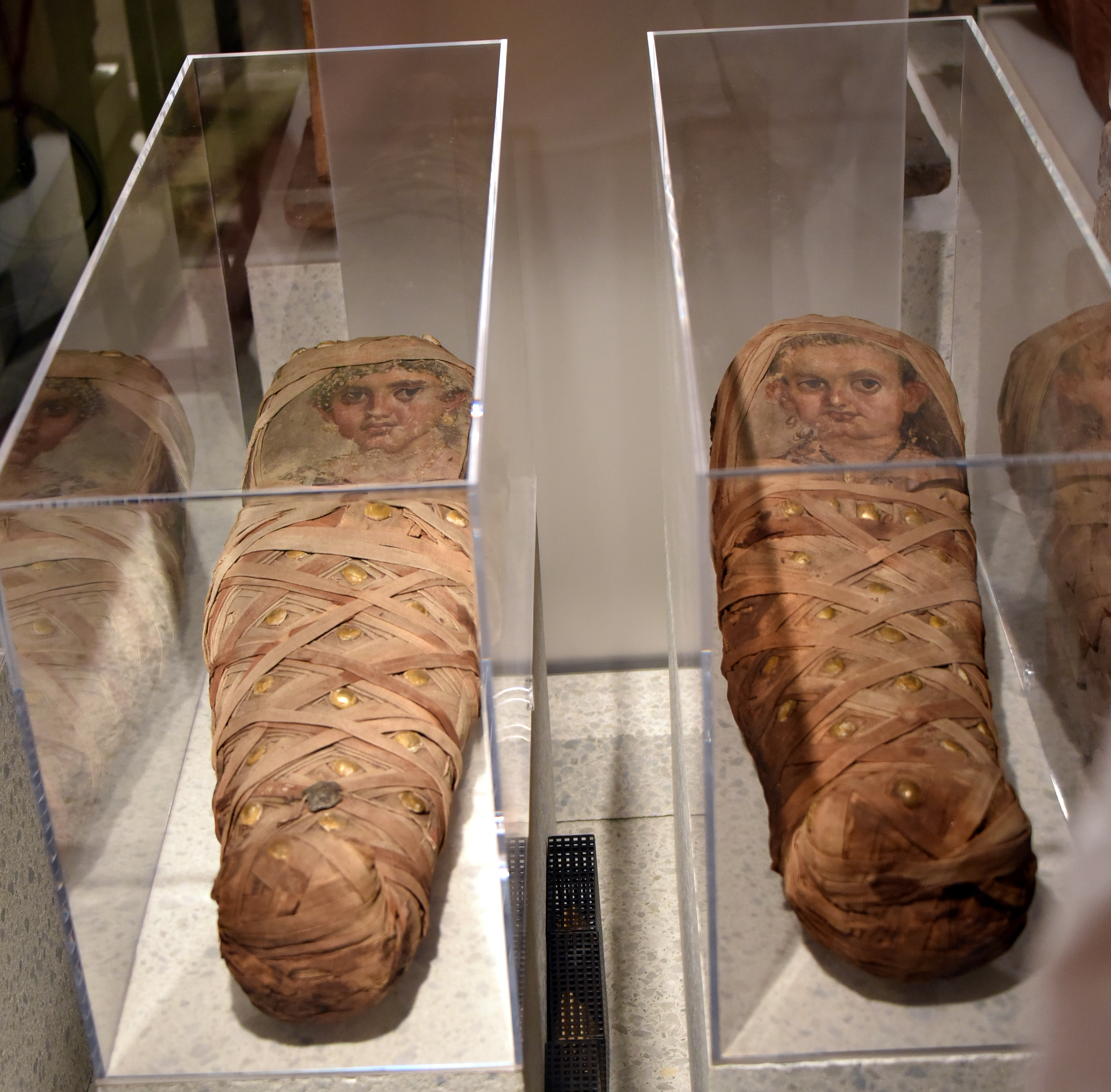
Two mummy coffins with their mummy portraits of two daughters of Aline

== Bibliography ==
- R. Germer/H. Kischkewitz/M. Lüning: Das Grab der Aline und die Untersuchung der darin gefundenen Kindermumien, in: Antike Welt 24 (1993), p. 186-196
- Hannelore Kischkewitz: Mumienporträt der Aline, in Das Ägyptische Museum Berlin, van Zabern, Mainz, p. 106 ISBN 3-8053-1184-2
- Barbara Borg: "Der zierlichste Anblick der Welt …". Ägyptische Porträtmumien, Mainz 1998 (Zaberns Bildbände zur Archäologie) p. 17-20 ISBN 3-8053-1742-5
- Rose-Marie Hagen/Rainer Hagen: Ägyptische Kunst, Taschen, Köln u.a. 2007, p. 94f. ISBN 978-3-8228-5455-6

== See also ==
- Fayum mummy portraits
- Panel painting
- Ancient Roman art
