= Beatrice Helg =

Swiss photographer (born 1956)

- Born: 8 March 1956 (age 70); Geneva, Switzerland
- Known for: Photography, visual arts

Beatrice Helg (born 8 March 1956) is a Swiss photographer.

== Biography ==
Béatrice Helg was born in Geneva, Switzerland in 1956. Firstly, she studied cello at the Geneva Music Conservatory. After that she studied photography at the California College of Arts and Crafts in Oakland as well as in Brooks Institute in Santa Barbara. She also studied photography at International Center of Photography in New York. Helg took part in the organization of La Fotografia in Venice 79 photography exhibition. Helg lives and works in Geneva. Béatrice Helg is known for fusion of still life photography with geometric abstraction as well as using industrial materials.

== Exhibitions ==
=== Solo ===
- 1983 "Unnamed exhibition" Jane Corkin Gallery, Toronto, Canada
- 1983 "Stille Gesichter" Galerie für Fotografie, Stuttgart, Germany
- 1983 "Stille Gesichter" Galerie Zur Stockeregg, Zürich, Switzerland
- 1983 "Visages de Silence". Galerie Sonia Zannettacci, Geneva, Switzerland
- 1994 "Architectonic Illusion", Southeast Museum of Photography, Daytona Beach, Florida
- 2006 "Béatrice Helg – an accrochage", Museum Tinguely, Basel, Switzerland
- 2012 "Risonanze", Museo Fortuny, Venice, Italy
- 2014 "Résonances", Ditesheim & Maffei Fine Art SA, Neuchâtel, Switzerland
- 2015 "Cosmos", Galerie Thessa Herold, Paris, France
- 2015 "Cosmos", as part of "Paris Photo", Grand Palais, Paris, France

=== Group ===
- The AIPAD Photography Show, Joel Soroka Gallery, The Park Avenue Armory, New York City, United States

== Collections ==
Helg's works are part of public galleries and museum collections, including Museum of Fine Arts, Houston, Minneapolis Institute of Art, Albert H. Small Collection, National Gallery of Canada, George Eastman Museum, Los Angeles County Museum of Art, Institut Valencià d'Art Modern, Maison européenne de la photographie, Musée de l'Élysée, Museum Tinguely.

== Bibliography ==
- Béatrice Helg : à la lumière de l'ombre (in French). Arles. 2006. ISBN 2742761756.
