= Jochen H.H. Ehrich =

German doctor

Jochen H.H. Ehrich (born 5 January 1946) is a German pediatric doctor in the fields of nephrology and tropical medicine, professor emeritus and Former Head of the Department of Paediatric Kidney, Liver and Metabolic Diseases at the Children’s Hospital, Hannover Medical School, in Hannover, Germany.

== Life and education ==
Jochen H.H. Ehrich was born in Braunschweig, Germany. He studied medicine from 1965 to 1971 at the Freie Universität Berlin and at the University of Lausanne, Switzerland. He performed in 1971 to 1972 a postgraduate study at London School of Hygiene and Tropical Medicine in London, UK and received the Diploma in Clinical Medicine of the Tropics.

== Career ==
From 1994-1997 he was Professor of Paediatrics and Head of Paediatric Nephrology at the Charité Hospital, Humboldt University of Berlin and from 1997-2011 he was Professor of Paediatrics and Head of Department of Paediatrics at the Children’s Hospital of Hannover Medical School.

== Clinical focus ==
His clinical responsibilities include paediatric nephrology, hepato-gastroenterology, endocrinology, tropical diseases and metabolic disorders.

== Research ==
His research activities are dealing with kidney diseases in Europe and in the Tropics, laboratory diagnosis of renal diseases, solid organ transplantation, metabolic disorders, as well as diversity of health care services in 46 European countries.

== International academic activities and work in international societies ==
- Member of the EDTA/ERA Registry 1988-1992
- Secretary general of European Society for Paediatric Nephrology 2000-2003
- Expert at the Council of Europe, Strasbourg, France, on “Child-Friendly Health Care” 2009-2011
- Guest professor at the Scientific Centre of Children’s Health in Moscow, Russia from 15 January- 15 March 2012
- Guest professor at University Children’s Hospital in Innsbruck, Austria from 1.11.2012 – 28.2.2013
- Member of the European Paediatric Association since 1996

== Awards ==
- Honorary member of the Hungarian Society of Nephrology in Budapest, Nov 14th 2002
- Purkinje Medal of the Charles University in Prague, June 8, 2006
- Honorary member of the Polish Society for Paediatric Nephrology in Szczecin, 7 May 2009
- Honorary Professor of Paediatrics of the Russian Academy of Science, Scientific Centre of Children’s Health, Moscow, 25 September 2009
- Johann Gottfried Herder Grant and Visiting Professorship at Russian Academy of Medical Science, Scientific Centre of Children’s Health, Moscow, 15 January -15 March 2012.

== Publications ==
Jochen H.H. Ehrich is the author of more than 250 papers in English and more than 200 in German.

- PubMed Jochen H.H. Ehrich publicationlist
- PubFacts Jochen H.H. Ehrich publicationlist
- Literature by and about Jochen H.H. Ehrich in the German National Library catalogue
