= Aline Réveillaud de Lens =

French painter

- Aline de Lens
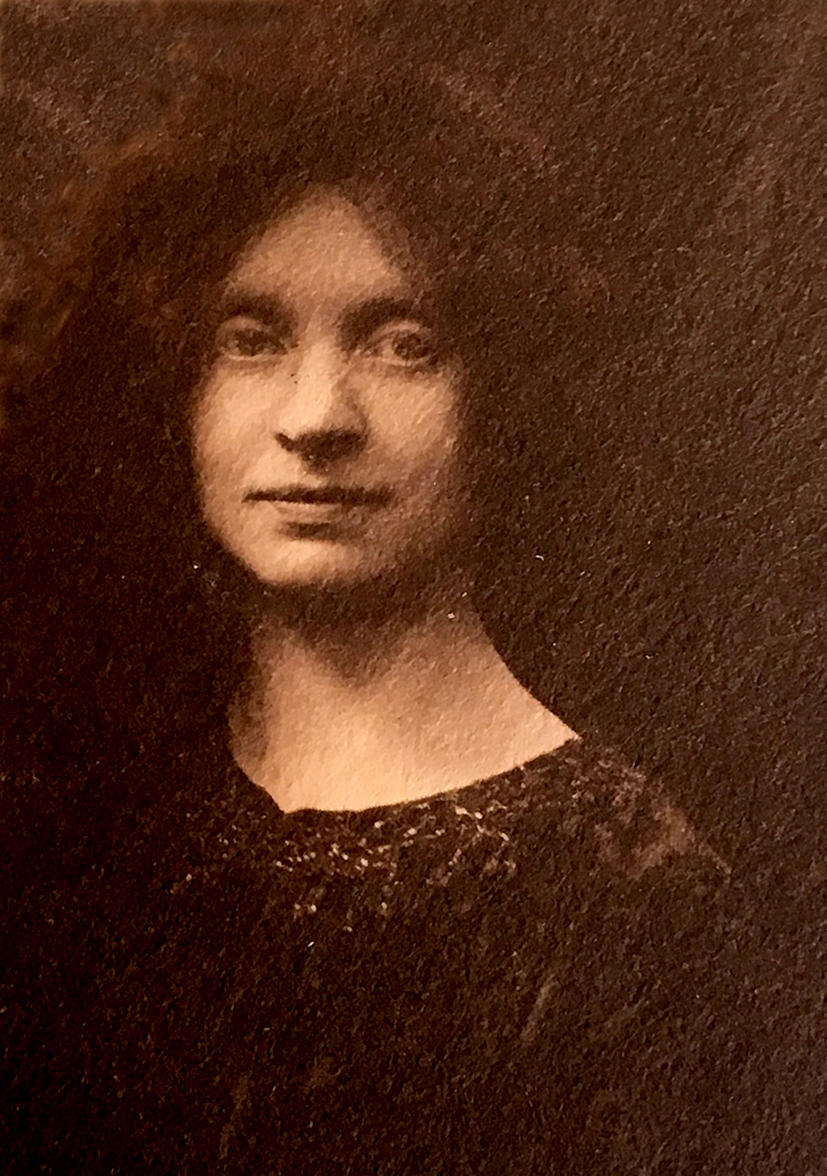
- Aline de Lens, ca 1910.
- Born: 2 March 1881; Paris, France
- Died: 10 February 1925 (aged 43); Fez, Morocco
- Education: École nationale supérieure des beaux-arts de Paris
- Spouse: André Réveillaud
- Writing career
- Language: French
- Genre: Novelist • Painter
- Notable works: Le Harem entr’ouvert (1919), Derrière les vieux murs en ruines. Roman marocain (1922), L’Etrange Aventure d’Aguida (1925), Pratiques des harems marocains. Sorcelleries, médecine, beauté (1925), Journal 1902-1924. « L’amour, je le supplie de m’épargner… » (2007)

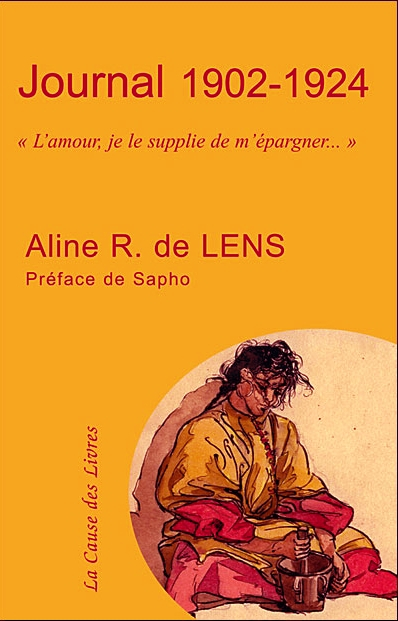
The cover of the first edition of the diary of Aline Réveillaud de Lens

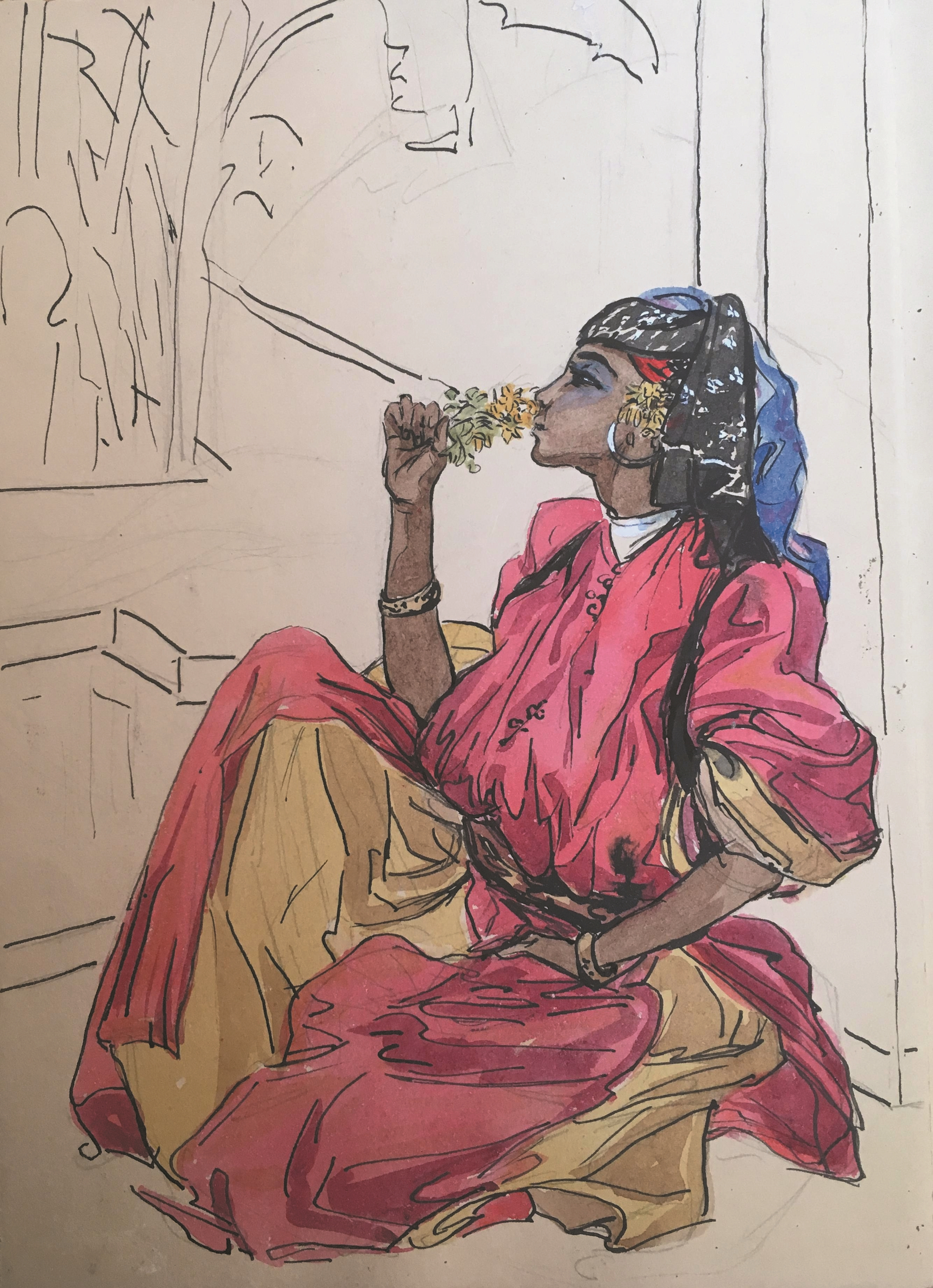
A gouache by Aline Réveillaud de Lens from the collection “Moroccan Women”

Aline Réveillaud de Lens (born 2 March 1881, in Paris, died 10 February 1925, in Fez), was a French novelist and painter who lived and worked in Tunisia and Morocco. She signed her works A. R. de Lens, A.-R. de Lens and Aline de Lens.

== Life ==
De Lens was the first of five children of Emile Delens (the spelling of the family name was officially changed in 1921). Her father was a famous Parisian surgeon. The well-off family provided the children with an artistic education typical of the time: de Lens played the violin and drew. In her diary she confessed that she had wanted to follow in her father's footsteps and study biology or chemistry, but her poor health and neurasthenia had not allowed her to realize this dream.

De Lens enrolled in the Académie Julian and in 1904 was one of the first women admitted to the Paris Academy of Fine Arts (atelier Humbert). In 1908 she went to Spain to improve her health. The same year she met André Réveillaud, six years younger than her. They decided to get married, but refused to consummate their marriage so as not to lose the unique feeling that had united them.

Both families found the marriage of their children difficult to accept, and the couple decided to leave France. In 1911, on the day after their wedding, they left France for Tunis where André became a colonial official. At the end of 1913, he was transferred to Morocco, a newly created French Protectorate, and the couple moved to Rabat. In 1915, in the Revue de Paris, de Lens published her first article "Au Maroc pendant la guerre" (In Morocco during the war). The article praised the colonial policy of France and the action of General Lyautey, the French Resident-General in Morocco, who was delighted with this text. De Lens later dedicated to him the second part of her short stories Le harem entr’ouvert. Mœurs marocaines (Half-open harem. Moroccan customs).

In November 1915, the Réveillaud family moved to Meknes. De Lens was involved in the works of the Service des Arts Indigènes, an office dealing with the protection of Moroccan cultural heritage, and wrote several articles to familiarize French readers with Moroccan culture and art. In 1917, she began to publish the collection of novels Le harem entr'ouvert. In 1922 her novel Derrière les vieux murs en ruines (Behind the old ruined walls) was published.

On May 24, 1921, De Lens confessed in her diary that she had been seriously ill for two years and that her left breast had just been amputated. However, the surgery didn't help. The brothers Jean and Jérôme Tharaud, who paid her a visit shortly before her death, described her body as exhausted by suffering. In the last entry of her diary, her husband wrote that she had spent the last ten months of her life lying almost motionless and suffering and in pain. Aline Réveillaud de Lens died on February 10, 1925, in Fez.

== Works ==
In 1947, her sister Marie-Thérèse donated a collection of more than a hundred of her paintings to the new town hall in Meknes, where they were to be kept at the permanent exhibition. Currently, only six of her canvases can be seen in one of the buildings of the Meknes city authorities. In the private archives of the de Lens family there is a list of the paintings transferred to city authorities, including photographs of six; the family also owns 20 original gouaches, one of which decorates the cover of the first edition of her diary.

Between 1917 and 1919, 23 of her short stories appeared in the Revue de Paris, which were jointly published in 1919 under the title: Le harem entr’ouvert (Half-open harem). The book consists of two parts, Tunisian and Moroccan, and presents the problems of indigenous women such as their confinement and their dependence on man, but also their everyday pleasures. In the "Tunisian" novels, the European narrator is easily identifiable with the author, while in the second one, inspired by the writer's stay in Morocco, she uses vocabulary and phrases indicating that the narrator is a part of the Maghreb world. Some short stories in the "Moroccan" part are also inspired by classical Arabic poetry and the tradition of public storytellers.

In 1922 Derrière les vieux murs en ruines (Behind the old walls in ruins) was published. It has the subtitle Moroccan novel and is written in the form of a diary of a French woman who has just moved to Meknes. The novel plot is about the planned marriage of a local rich man with a teenage daughter of his old enemy, who gave her a rare privilege in the Islamic world she could not be married against her will. The girl does not want to marry a much older man, but he bribes her relatives and manages to marry her. But this story is only a pretext to describe the life of Moroccan women and their relationships with the European narrator. It demonstrates a respect to different culture, very rare at the time

Just before her death in 1925, de Lens published L’étrange aventure d’Aguida (The strange adventure of Aguida). This is a collection of three short stories whose narrative scheme is similar: because of some manipulations of their compatriots, Moroccan protagonists find themselves in a difficult situation and are rescued by French couple, easily identifiable with the Réveillaud family. Despite this content, which suggests that the writer chooses the colonial perspective, the narrative favours the Moroccan point of view and the presence of the French in Morocco is not unequivocally judged as positive.

In 1925, after the writer's death, her book Pratiques des harems marocains. Sorcelleries, médecine, beauté (Practices of Moroccan harems. Witchcraft, medicine, beauty) was published. It consists of magic recipes collected by Aline Réveillaud de Lens in harems and is preceded by her introduction. These recipes were already published in the journal Maroc Médical. The author does not comment on described practices, sometimes absurd from the point of view of medicine and the introduction to the book shows that she respects Moroccans and wants to understand them.

In 1932, the Revue de Paris published another collection of her short stories Jardins maures (Maurian gardens). The real protagonist of the texts is the space and the gardens of the title. They become a substitute for living nature and a place that consoles Muslim women living in confinement.

De Lens was also the author of many articles. Sometimes, these are purely ethnographic, such as “La Fête des Aïssaouas à Meknès” (The Feast of Aissaouas in Meknes). Sometimes they are propaganda articles, such as "Au Maroc pendant la guerre" (In Morocco during the war), already quoted or "La Main-d’œuvre féminine au Maroc" (The Female Labor Force in Morocco), in which she suggests that Moroccan women living in harems should start working there, which would be profitable for the society. Such propaganda is practically absent from her short stories and novels.

In 2007, the diary of de Lens was published by La Cause des Livres. It was prepared for publication in the 1920s, however, the project fell through due to the death of her husband in 1926. Extensive fragments of the diary were used by the Taraud brothers in their novel Les Bien aimées (The Beloved), published in 1932. The diary was found among their papers in the manuscript department of the National Library of France by Philippe Lejeune, who was working on his book Le Moi des demoiselles. Enquête sur le journal de jeune fille. He described in it Aline Réveillaud de Lens and her diary.

== Publications ==
=== Articles ===
- "Au Maroc pendant la guerre", La Revue de Paris, no 1, le 1er novembre 1915, p. 161-171.
- "Bijoux des mille et une nuits", France-Maroc. Revue mensuelle, no 5, le 15 mai 1917, p. 30-33.
- "La Fête des Aïssaouas à Meknès", France-Maroc. Revue mensuelle, no 1, le 15 janvier 1918, p. 25-26.
- "La Journée d’une Chérifa", Lecture pour tous, juin 1922, p. 1246.
- "La Main-d’œuvre féminine au Maroc", France-Maroc. Revue mensuelle, no 2, le 15 février 1919, p. 53-54.
- "La Médicine des Indigènes marocainp. Les pratiques médicales de matrones à Meknès", Maroc Médical, no 5, le 15 mars 1922, p. 194-198; no 6, le 15 avril 1922, p. 240-242; no 7, le 15 mai 1922, p. 279-280; no 8, le 15 juin 1922, p. 309-311; no 9, le 15 juillet 1922, p. 333-335; no 10, le 15 août 1922, p. 357-359; no 11, le 15 septembre 1922, p. 391-392; no 12, le 15 octobre 1922, p. 421-422.
- "Le Bonheur des Musulmanes", L’Action Nationale, tome XVIII, janvier-juin 1922, p. 270-272.
- "Les Arts indigènes au Maroc", Le Maroc Artistique, 1917, numéro spéciale : L’Art et les artistes, p. 30-44.
- "Les Femmes marocaines et la guerre", Le Maroc Artistique, mai 1919, p. 281-289.
- "Un mariage à Meknès dans la petite bourgeoisie", Revue du Monde Musulman, vol. XXXV, 1917–1918, p. 31-55.
- "Un Prévost des Marchands au XXe Siècle. Le Mohtasseb", France-Maroc. Revue Mensuelle, no 4, le 15 avril 1919, p. 110.
- "Une femme-peintre marocaine", France-Maroc. Revue Mensuelle, no 3, le 15 mars 1917, p. 25-27.

=== Novels and short stories published in magazines ===
- Derrière les vieux murs en ruines, La Revue de Paris, janvier-février 1922, p. 117-138, 332-358 i 609-626; and mars-avril 1922, p. 378-398, 601-633.
- Jardins maures, La Revue de Paris, Septembre-Octobre 1932, p. 637-650.
- Le Harem entr’ouvert (1ère partie), La Revue de Paris, juillet-août 1917, p. 295-382.
- Le Harem entr’ouvert (fin), La Revue de Paris, juillet-aoűt 1917, p. 525-564.
- Le Harem entr’ouvert. Mœurs marocaines (2e partie), La Revue de Paris, mai-juin 1919, p. 129-162.
- Le Harem entr’ouvert. Mœurs marocaines (fin), La Revue de Paris, mai-juin 1919, p. 377-402.
- Marouf le clairvoyant, Revue de France, no 15, le 15 août 1922, p. 713-741.

=== Books ===
- Derrière les vieux murs en ruines. Roman marocain, Paris, Calmann-Lévy Éditeurs, 1922.
- Journal 1902–1924. « L’amour, je le supplie de m’épargner… », texte revu par Antoinette Weil, préface de Sapho, Paris, La Cause des Livres, 2007. ISBN 978-2-9519363-8-6
- Le Harem entr’ouvert, Paris, Calmann-Lévy Éditeurs, 1919. The second edition: Éditions Le Fennec, Casablanca, 2009. ISBN 978-9954-415-97-9
- L’Etrange Aventure d’Aguida, Paris, Les Éditions de France, 1925.
- Pratiques des harems marocains. Sorcelleries, médecine, beauté. Avec une préface par les docteurs Speder et Lépinay, Paris, Librairie orientaliste Paul Geuthner, 1925. The second edition: Éditions du Sirocco, Casablanca, 2008. ISBN 9954-8851-3-7

== Bibliography ==
- Réveillaud de Lens, Aline (2007). Journal 1902-1924. " L'amour, je le supplie de m'épargner… ". Paris: La Cause des Livres. ISBN 978-2-9519363-8-6.
- Amster, Ellen (2009). "The Harem Revealed and the Islamic-French Family: Aline de Lens and a French Woman's Orient in Lyautey's Morocco". French Historical Studies. 32 (3): 279–312. doi:10.1215/00161071-2008-020. ISSN 0016-1071.
- Sokołowicz, Małgorzata (2020). Orientalisme, colonialisme, interculturalité. L'œuvre d'Aline Réveillaud de Lens. Warszawa: Wydawnictwa Uniwersytetu Warszawskiego. p. 378. doi:10.31338/uw.9788323542131. ISBN 978-83-235-4205-6. S2CID 219510125.
- Lejeune, Philippe (1993). Le Moi des demoiselles. Enquête sur le journal de jeune fille. Paris: Le Seuil. ISBN 978-2-9519363-8-6.
