= Louis R. Ehrich =

- Born: January 23, 1849; Albany, New York, US
- Died: October 23, 1911 (aged 62); London, UK
- Resting place: Salem Fields Cemetery
- Education: Hopkins Grammar School, Yale University
- Occupations: Businessman and art dealer
- Spouse: Henrietta M. Ehrich

Signature
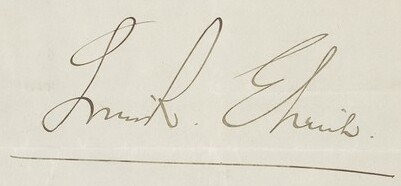

Louis R. Ehrich (January 23, 1849 – October 23, 1911) was an American businessman, art dealer, and politician. He was active in late nineteenth-century and early twentieth-century politics, with ties to the Anti-Imperialist movement and the Gold Democrats. In addition to his presence in the political and commercial circles of his day, he is notable for having established the Ehrich Galleries, an institution that provided Old Masters to Gilded Age art collectors, including the industrialists Henry Clay Frick and Henry E. Huntington.

== Early life and education ==
Ehrich was born in Albany, New York on January 23, 1849, to Joseph and Rebecca Sporburg Ehrich. He attended Hopkins Grammar School in New Haven, CT before graduating from Yale University in 1869. He went on to study at the University of Berlin, and divided his time between New York and Europe for much of the 1870s and 1880s, studying the Renaissance and Baroque paintings that would become his livelihood.

== Career ==
=== Politics and commerce ===
After graduating from Yale, Ehrich helped his brothers William and Jules run the Ehrich Brothers Dry Goods Store (est. 1857). Telling the New York Tribune that the stress of retail had left William with a "shattered constitution", Louis resigned from his own position in 1886. His health led him to relocate to Colorado Springs in 1889, where he served as vice president of the Colorado Springs and Interurban Railway company, director of the First National Bank, and president of the Board of Trade of Colorado Springs, acting in several smaller business ventures simultaneously. Along with his interest in trade and land development, Ehrich was heavily involved in politics for much of his life. Throughout the 1890s and early 1910s, he was an executive member of the Anti-Imperialist League and the Gold Democrats Party, as well as an advocate for free trade, often publishing op eds on the subject. In 1896, he was the sole delegate from the Rocky Mountain Region at the 1896 Democratic National Convention, also known as the Gold Convention of 1896. He wrote and published The Question of Silver to further explicate his views on the Free Silver issue. Despite his early opposition to William Jennings Bryan because of their differing opinions on the Gold Standard, Ehrich reconciled with him by the date of the 1900 election, largely thanks to Bryan's firm stance against the American annexation of the Philippines.

=== Ehrich Galleries ===
In the mid-1890s, Ehrich combined his interest in European paintings with his knowledge of business to found the Ehrich Galleries in New York City. Located on Fifth Avenue, the galleries originally specialized in Old Masters exclusively. Ehrich's judgement was purportedly esteemed by well-known art expert Bernard Berenson. He provided art to individuals such as Samuel Untermyer, Stanford White, and Archer M. Huntington. Paintings from the Ehrich Galleries were sometimes donated to or purchased by the Metropolitan Museum of Art, or became part of private collections. Ehrich Galleries remained open after Ehrich's death in 1911. Ownership passed to his sons, Harold and Walter Ehrich, who donated some of its holdings to the Yale University Art Gallery in memory of their father Louis. Under Harold and Walter's leadership, the galleries began to incorporate a greater number of modern and American paintings in the 1920s and 1930s. It merged with the Newhouse Galleries in 1934, becoming the Ehrich-Newhouse Galleries. The galleries continued to exhibit and sell art until Walter Ehrich's death in 1936, after which the Newhouse Galleries became an independent entity once again.

== Personal life ==
Ehrich married Henrietta Minsezheimer in 1874. In addition to Harold and Walter, who ran Ehrich Galleries after Louis's death, they had a daughter named Leah. Louis Ehrich was a trustee at the Metropolitan Museum of Art, and a member of the Yale Club, the American Jewish Historical Society, and the Mozart Choral Society of Colorado Springs.
