= William Ernst Ehrich =

New York sculptor

William Ernst Ehrich (12 July 1897 Königsberg, East Prussia – 10 August 1960 Rochester, New York) was an American sculptor, ceramicist, public monument artist, educator, and Work Progress Administration (WPA) supervisor.

Ehrich created decorative art work at the Buffalo Zoo and Buffalo City Hall. An exhibiting and award-winning regional artist, Ehrich later moved to Rochester to teach sculpture at the Memorial Art Gallery and the University of Rochester until his death in 1960.

Ehrich was noted by Harold Olmsted of the Albright-Knox Gallery’ for “attain[ing] a modest national reputation for his figurative sculpture…”.

== Early life in Germany ==
William Ehrich was born in Königsberg, German Empire. Ehrich had three sisters and four brothers, of whom three became architects. Ehrich became a woodcarver’s apprentice and later studied sculpture and ceramics as a scholarship student at the State Art School (Kunst- und Gewerkschule). He studied there under the direction of Hermann Brachert, Franz Andreas Threyne, and Erich Schmidt-Kestner,

In March 1916, during World War I, Ehrich was inducted into the German Imperial Army. He fought on both the Eastern Front and the Western Front. Captured by the Imperial Russian Army, he was chosen by his jailers as unofficial camp artist.

At the end of the war, Erlich returned to Königsberg. In 1920, he returned to art school. During his studies at the State Art School, Ehrich was hired by his senior professors to execute works for them. In 1929 Ehrich collaborated with his professor, Erich Schmidt-Kestner to carve the reliefs around the entrances of the Hauptbahnhof (main train station) in Königsberg. The travertine reliefs above the doors representing travel by water, land, and air and arrival and departure were executed by Ehrich. The relief are considered incorrectly attributed to Schmidt-Kestner a claim corroborated in the German art history text by Mühlpfordt, Herbert M. (Holzner Verlag, Würzburg 1970, pp. 67, entry 3).

In 1927, Erlich sculpted the heads of Copernicus, Kant, Herder, and Corinth above the main door to a school on Lehndorfstraße. The heads were destroyed in 1945.

== Emigration to Buffalo ==
In 1929, Ehrich and his wife Ruth immigrated to Buffalo, New York under sponsorship of an uncle. In Buffalo, he worked for the uncle carving Kittinger furniture. Ehrich found a market mass during the Great Depression producing sets of china animals from original plaster molds. Ehrich won numerous prizes in exhibitions for his ceramics in exhibitions in New York City, Rochester, Syracuse and Buffalo.

Ehrich became a popular sculpture instructor through open demonstrations at the city’s WPA adult school. Through this appointment, Ehrich produced public works, including the wooden sculpture of St. Andrew displayed at Buffalo’s St. Andrew’s Episcopal Church. He taught at the school from 1933 to 1938. In 1937, He sculpted a bronze tablet honoring Mayor Charles E. Roesch for the foyer of Buffalo City Hall in 1937. Also in 1937, she started commuting to Rochester to teach a one-day class at the Memorial Art Gallery.

In 1938, he was appointed project manager of the Buffalo Zoo expansion (1938–1939). Ehrich’s notes indicate that he directed sculptural work at the entrance gates and fountain and the sgraffito decorating the exterior of the animal houses.

== Teaching career in Rochester ==
In 1938, Ehrich was named director of the Federal Art Project for Rochester. That same year, he received an appointment at the University of Rochester and in 1941 moved to Rochester. He taught at the MAG following a day’s work at his university studio, doing so six days per week. For his exhibition and commission work, Ruth Ehrich did most of the business management and correspondence necessary for marketing, shipping, and travel. Ehrich later became head of the sculpture department.

In 1950 Erlich created the Goethe monument for the City of Rochester in Highland Park. With John Rothwell Slater of the University of Rochester he also created the Eastman Centennial Monument located on the University campus.

Around 1950, Ehrich introduced copper enameling as a new class at the MAG. In 1954 he created a large sunflower from individually enameled copper petals, the University symbol, now mounted on the Hajm Gymnasium at the University.

In 1955, Ehrich received a new studio and sculpture classrooms at the University of Rochester after advancing his position and was experimenting with lost wax bronze casting. His new foundry was built at the university in 1959 and produced a number of works that year. Erlich studied for it in Munich with the sculptor Heinrich Kirchner.

Erlich continued to make commemorative bronze tablets.a. He would hand carve inverse text in plaster blanks in his own font to produce a desired inscription. Then a plaster positive was made from the carved blank for the bronze foundries.

William Ehrich died in 1960

== Professional career ==
In addition to public works and works in private collections, Ehrich’s sculptures and drawings can be found in the permanent collections the Albright-Knox Gallery and Burchfield Penney Art Center. His works are also part of the MAG icollection.

In Ehrich’s first one-man show in New York City in 1941, his work had “favorable notices from critics” and his work was “likened … [to] Barlach”. This marks what would continue as the critical establishment of Ehrich’s “modest national reputation for his figurative sculpture under the considerable stylistic influence of Barlach”, although Ehrich himself did not in fact study with Barlach. Ehrich was known for his carved and polished fieldstone and abstract expressionist style.

Ehrich won awards while exhibiting his work throughout western and central New York and New York City, including ceramics, drawings and especially sculpture. This included a Patteran Prize in 1938 at the Albright-Knox Gallery. Ehrich also won The Menno Alexander Reeb Memorial Prize several times for sculpture and drawing.
