= Meshullam Ehrlich =

Polish-Jewish philologist and scholar

- Born: 1818; Lublin, Congress Poland
- Died: 1861 (aged 42–43); Paris, Second French Empire

Meshullam Ehrlich (Yiddish: משולם ערליך; 1818–1861) was a Polish-Jewish philologist and Talmudic scholar. Most of his works remained in manuscript, with the exception of one book in the field of Hebrew philology, published under the title Ḥeker Millim u-Sefat Ḳodesh (Paris, 1868).
