= Aline Fruhauf =

American caricaturist and painter (1907–1978)

- Born: 1907; New York City, U.S.
- Died: 1978 (aged 70–71)
- Education: Parsons School of Design
- Occupations: Caricaturist and painter
- Spouse: Erwin P. Vollmer (m. 1934)
- Children: 2

Aline Fruhauf (1907–1978) was an American caricaturist and painter known for her various mixed-media caricatures of musicians, the Supreme Court justices, and artists such as Stuart Davis, Yasuo Kuniyoshi, Max Weber, and Raphael Soyer, among others.

== Career ==
Aline Fruhauf's career began early for her as she went from art student to professional caricaturist while still attending Parsons School of Design in New York. Her first caricature appeared in New York World in 1926, her drawings were featured in New York dailies, and she was given a regular column in The Morning Telegraph a year later. She also regularly contributed to the periodical Musical America in 1927. In 1930, she enrolled in The Art Students League of New York, in order to transition from editorial pieces in newspapers to exhibiting and selling her art in galleries, as a result of the fall of the Stock Market and the decline of newspaper sales. Aline's first commissioned series were caricatures of legal figures based on satirists Ape and Spy. This series of New York judges (1934–1936) was the first time she had been on a regular payroll and was getting paid for what she loved to do. One of her most successful pieces from this series of prints was of the Supreme Court justices, The Nine Old Men (1936).

During the 1930s, Fruhauf was regularly featured in theater and art magazines, such as Creative Art in 1933, for her series of caricatures on artists and art dealers, and later she joined the graphics division of the Works Progress Administration (WPA) Federal Art Project, working there from March to December 1936 and preparing a series of caricatures of the WPA artists that were writing essays for the book Art for the Millions. By doing this, she met emerging New York artists like Max Weber and Stuart Davis.

In 1944, Aline and her husband, Dr. Erwin Vollmer, moved to Bethesda, Maryland, when he was posted to the Naval Medical Center, and after settling in, she contacted a former lithography classmate and resumed printmaking. In 1950, she was approached by a music critic of The Washington Star to do a series of caricatures of a Washington orchestra. This piece became known as "The Face of Music in Washington" and featured 24 paintings of conductors, composers, critics, and musicians displayed at the Dupont Theatre Art Gallery in 1957.

In the latter part of her career, she was honored with solo exhibitions at The Smithsonian in 1966, and The Corcoran Gallery of Art in 1977.

== Personal life ==
Fruhauf was born in 1907 in New York City. In 1934, Aline married Erwin P. Vollmer and they subsequently had two daughters. Fruhauf died aged 71 on May 27, 1978, in Bethesda, Maryland.

== Papers ==
Photographs of Fruhauf's work and friends, sketches, letters, clippings, typescripts and exhibition materials are stored in the Archives of American Art research collection (62 items on five partial reels of microfilm) known as "The Aline Fruhauf Papers".
