= Lycée-collège La Mennais =

Private Catholic school in Papeete, Tahiti

The lycée-collège La Mennais is a private Roman Catholic mixed secondary school in Papeete, Tahiti.

== See also ==
- List of universities in Polynesia
