= Aline Alaux =

French painter

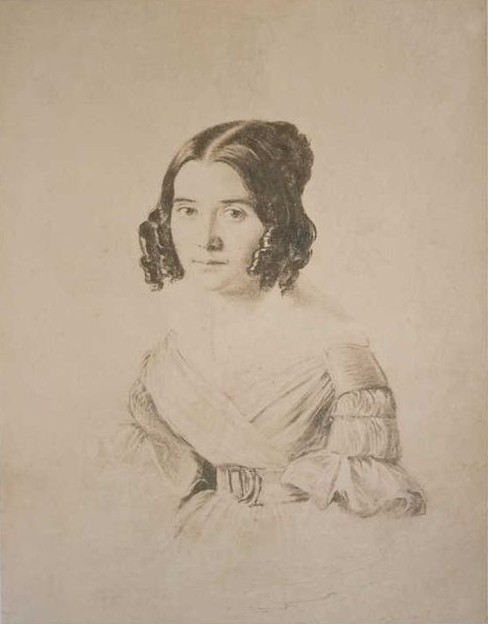
- Born: Marie-Rose Alaux; 31 January 1813; Bordeaux, France
- Died: 12 January 1856 (aged 42); Billère, France
- Other name: Aline Alaux

Aline Alaux (born 31 January 1813 – 12 October 1856) was a French painter.

== Early life ==
Alaux was born Marie-Rose Alaux in Bordeaux, to parents Jean-Paul Alaux and Marie-Anne Gué, known as Eugénie Gué. She married the painter Jean-Victor Bodinier in Bordeaux on 28 March 1848.

== Career ==
Alaux participated in the Paris Salons from 1833 to the Salon of 1843, with the exception of 1839 and 1842. In 1850 she exhibited at the New York Historical Society. She painted mainly animals and birds.

== Prizes ==
She received a gold medal at the Salon of 1833.

== Collections ==
- Musée du Louvre, Jeune fille dessinant
- Musée des Arts Décoratifs et du Design, Bordeaux : Étude de poisson - Perroquet au perchoir
- Château de Fontainebleau : Vue de l'église et du faubourg saint Eutrope à Saintes, (watercolour)
- Musée Alexandre Dumas : Auguste Caustre
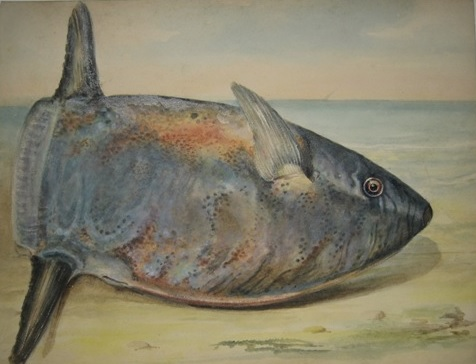
Study of fish

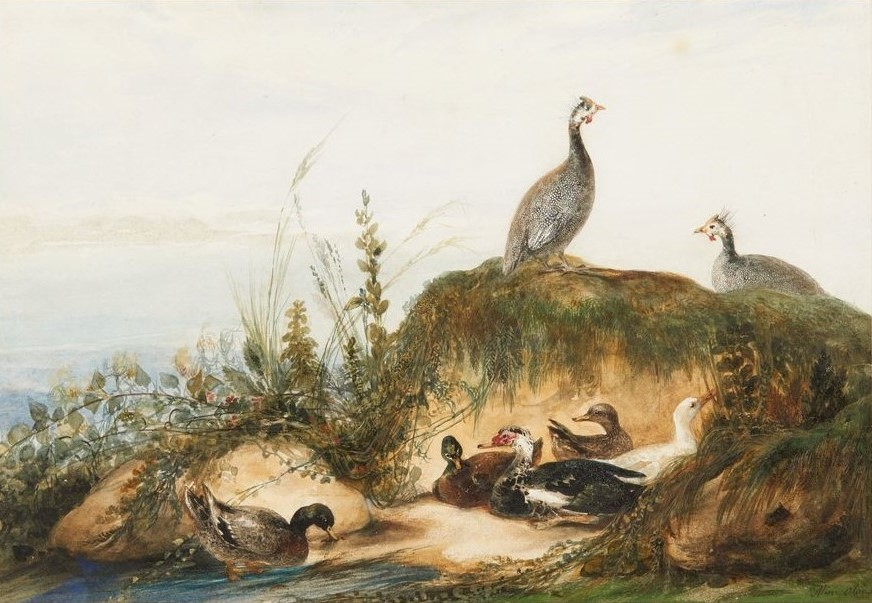
Ducks and guinea fowls, Salon of 1837

== Bibliography ==
- Gérald Schurr, Les petits maîtres de la peinture 1820-1920, valeur de demain, t. VII, Paris, Les Éditions de l'Amateur, 1989
