= Aline Helg =

Swiss historian (born 1953)

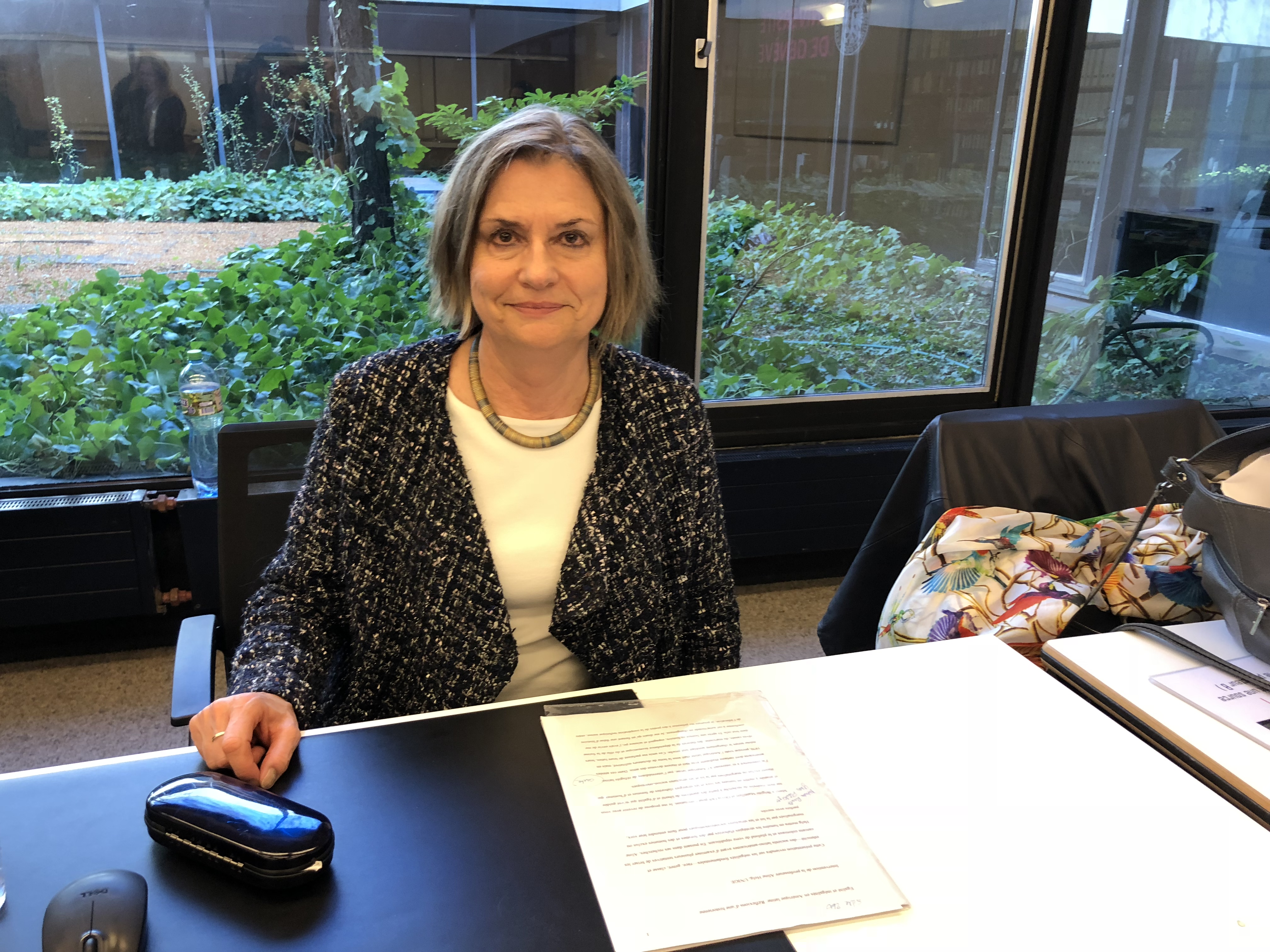

Personal details
- Born: 1953 (age 72–73)
- Education: University of Geneva
- Profession: Historian, Professor

Aline Helg is a historian, specializing in the history of slavery. She is known for her research and books on the history of revolutions, the Americas, the African diaspora, civil rights, racism and ethnicity.

== Biography ==
At the age of six, Helg and her parents left Switzerland to live in the United States. There, she experienced life in a country with a language unknown to her.

She returned to Switzerland to obtain her doctorate at the University of Geneva in 1983 and became a professor in the same institution in 2003. As Switzerland offered her few opportunities as a historian after her doctorate, she began her academic career in America working on Cuba, and Colombia. She was interested in emancipation movements and the racial question, and focused on how people demonstrated resilience to build a dignified life.

She subsequently taught at the Department of Political Science at University of Los Andes in Bogotá. She also taught at the Faculty of Psychology and Education sciences and at the University Institute of Development Studies of the University of Geneva and at the History Department of the University of Texas at Austin from 1989 to 2003.

== History of slavery and revolutions ==
Aline Helg claims that the slave populations of the Americas did not wait for their freedom to be granted, rather they built autonomous emancipation strategies.

Helg studied slaves in South America who obtained their freedom even before of the abolition of slavery occurred. In her writing, she examines the means by which the enslaved became free and found that active rebellion was not the most effective nor the most common form of emancipation. Browning (the flight towards the still unexplored American territories), emancipation through military conscription, the manumission participation, and integration of the slave point of view in the discourse on freedom are constitutive strategies developed gradually and a discreet resistance leading little by little towards the resumption of their freedoms in a process called "encapacitation". This research questions a vision of the 1980s that insists on impressive revolts and which somehow coincide with a sort of Santo Domingo syndrome.

Aline Helg also wrote articles for different publications such as "Black Men, Racial Stereotyping, and Violence in the U.S. South and Cuba at the Turn of the Century," published online by Comparative Studies in Society and History.

Her book, Plus jamais esclave (Slave No More), tells the story of Francisque Fabulé in particular.

Aline Helg regularly appears in the media as a specialist in the contemporary history of South America.

== Book chapters ==
- Race in Argentina and Cuba, 1880 1930, Edited by Richard Graham, Published July 2010.
- Race in Post-Abolition Afro-Latin America, with Kim Butler, pages 257 to 288

== Awards ==
In 2016 she received the award of the "Académie romande" for her work Plus jamais esclave. The book explores the liberation strategies adopted by the victims of slavery themselves in the Americas between 1492 and 1838.
