= Aline Ehrlich =

German-born biologist (1928–1991)

Aline Ehrlich, née Buchbinder (26 December 1928 – 5 February 1991), was a German-born freshwater biologist and geologist, recognized for her work on diatoms. She taught at the University of Paris, and then worked for twenty years for the Geological Survey of Israel, compiling the Atlas of the Inland-water Diatom Flora of Israel, which was published posthumously by the Israel Academy of Sciences and Humanities.

== Early life and education ==
Ehrlich was born in Berlin, Germany, on 26 December 1928. In 1938, when Ehrlich was ten, the family moved to hide from the Nazis in a small southern French village during the German occupation. She completed her secondary education in Pau, France. Ehrlich studied many subjects including chemistry, geology, botany and zoology at the University of Paris. It was at the university that Ehrlich developed her particular interest in diatoms.

== Career ==
Ehrlich taught in the geology department at the University of Paris, but in addition was also a high school biology teacher. In 1969 Ehrlich left her position with the Geological Department at the University of Paris and moved to Israel to work for the Geological Survey of Israel, where she remained for 20 years. She had had a childhood dream of living in Jerusalem. Ehrlich investigated distributions of calcareous nannofossils across inland Israel, and their use in stratigraphy. She also co-authored bibliographies of work on the geology of Lebanon and Syria. She compiled the Atlas of the Inland-water Diatom Flora of Israel before she died, although it was published posthumously, in 1995, by the Israel Academy of Sciences and Humanities, in the Flora Palaestina series.

Ehrlich was multi-lingual, speaking German, French, English, Russian and Hebrew.

Ehrlich died in 1991 aged 63, “after a severe and long-lasting disease”.

== Publications ==
- Ehrlich, A. (Aline)., Aḳademyah ha-leʼumit ha-Yiśreʼelit le-madaʻim., Makhon ha-geʼologi (Israel). (1995). Atlas of the inland-water diatom flora of Israel. Jerusalem: Geological Survey of Israel.
