= Pitsa panels =

Painted wooden tablets found near Pitsa, Corinthia (Greece)

Pitsa Panels
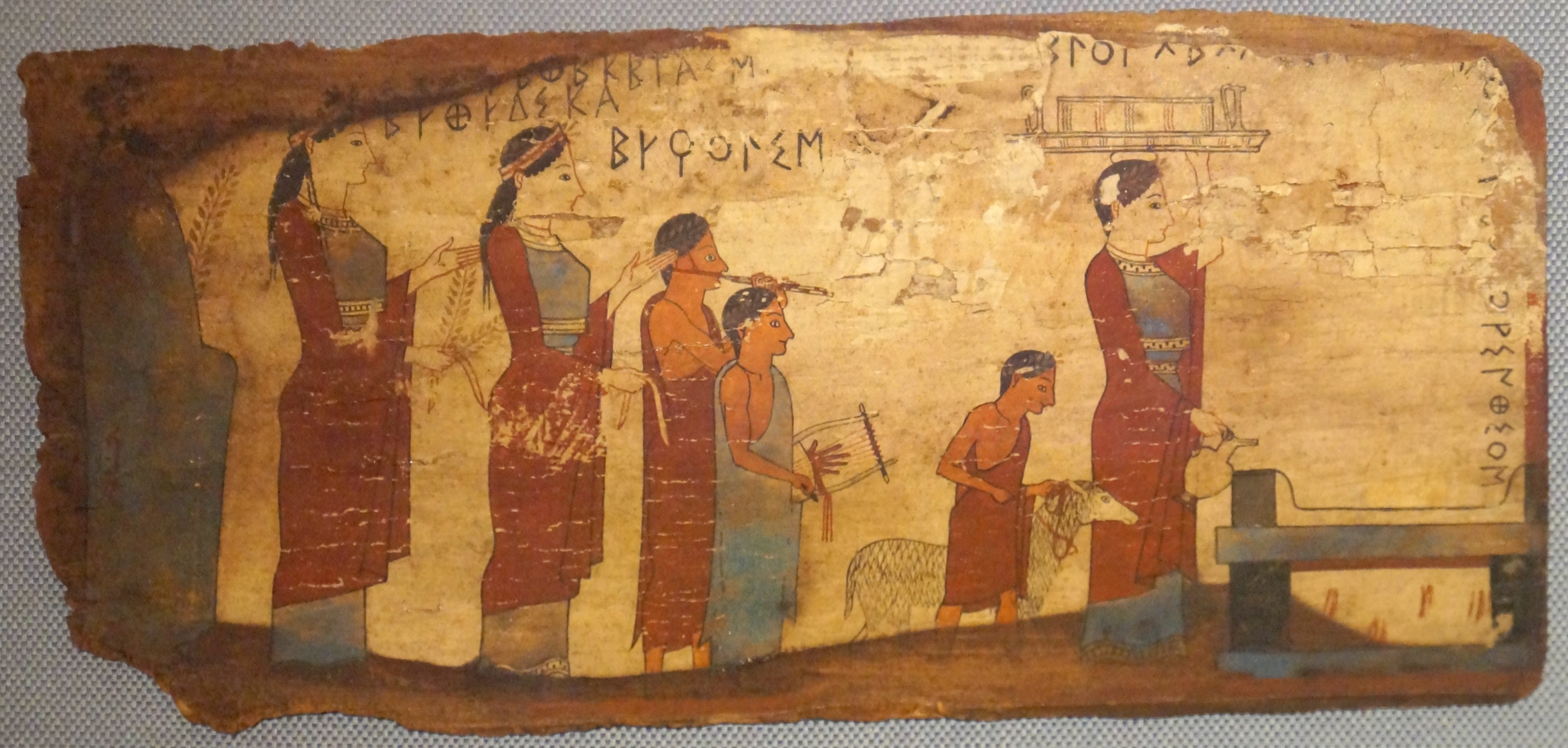
- Artist: Unknown painter
- Year: 550–500 BC
- Location: National Archaeological Museum, Athens

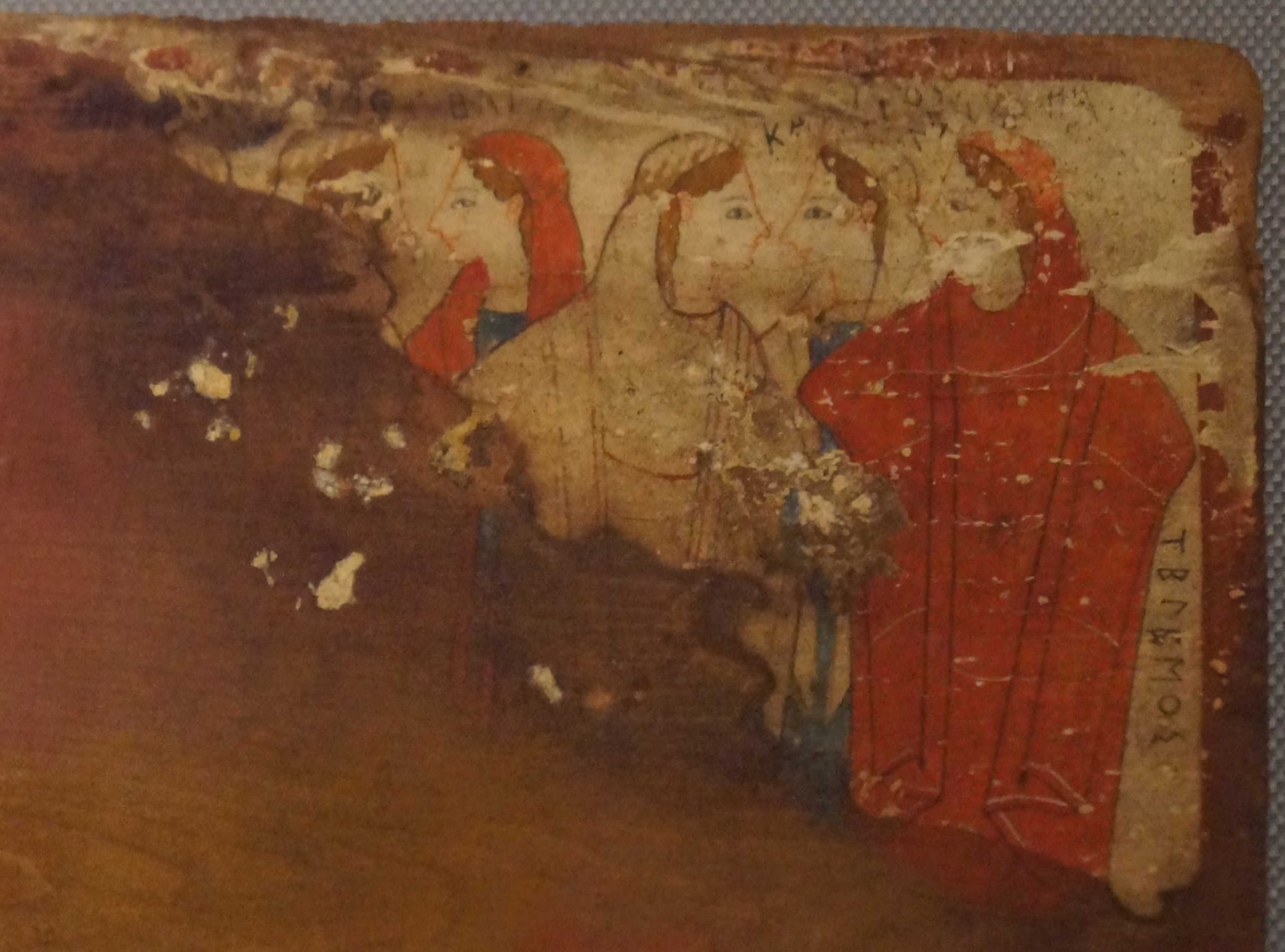
"Panel 2", NAMA 16467, the corner with all paint layers surviving.

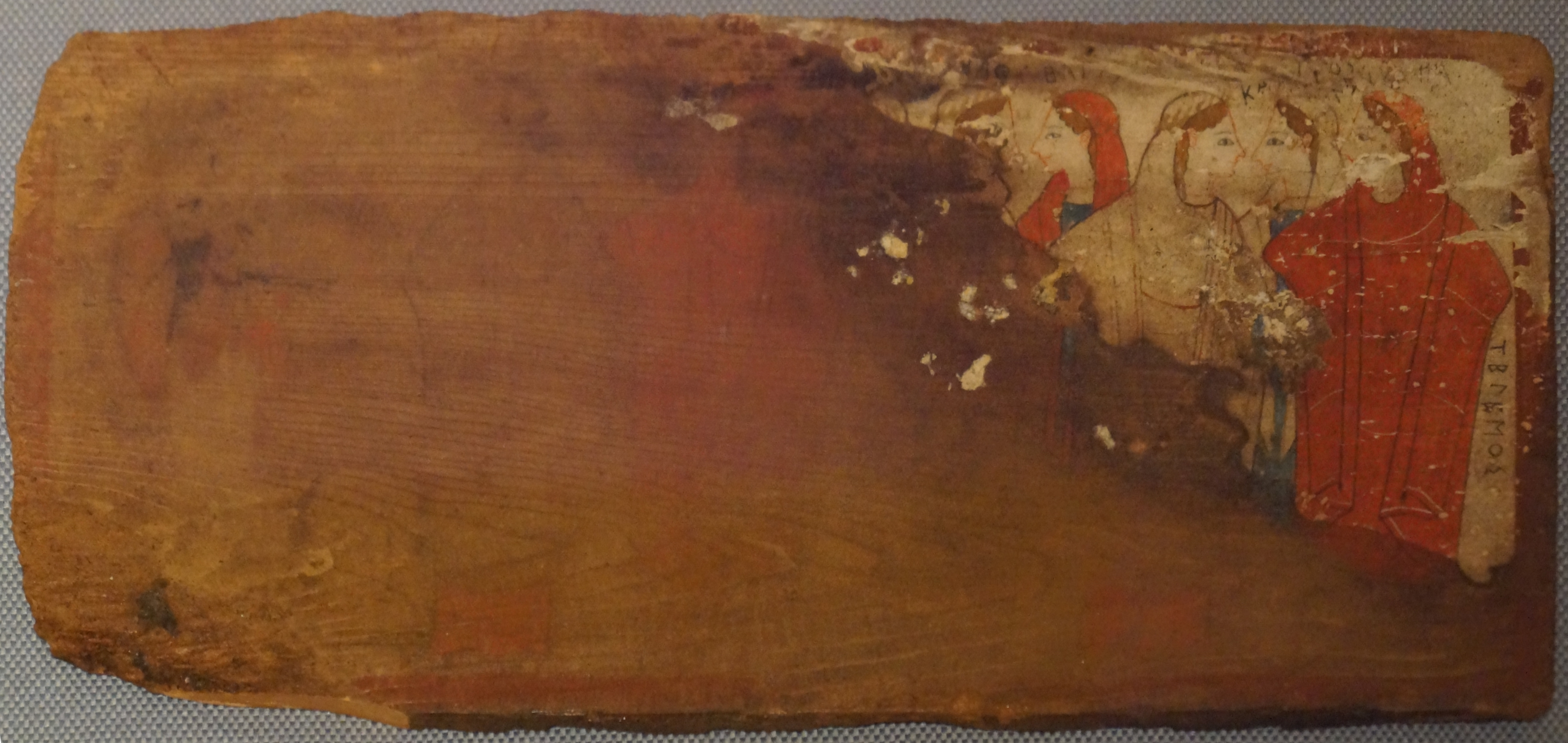
The full "Panel 2", NAMA 16467

The Pitsa panels or Pitsa tablets are a group of four painted wooden tablets found near Pitsa, Corinthia, Greece. They are the earliest surviving examples of Greek panel painting, and are now in the National Archaeological Museum of Athens, with the catalogue numbers NAMA 16464 to 16467.

The four panels, two of them highly fragmentary, were discovered during the 1930s in a cave near the village of Pitsa, in the vicinity of Sicyon. They can be stylistically dated to 550–500 BC, i.e., to the late Archaic period of ancient Greek art; this is at least as much from the style of the writing as that of the images. They are presumed to be the remains of four different works, rather than a series, which were all votive offerings commissioned by different people, and deposited in a cave regarded as a holy place, perhaps after being displayed elsewhere. Modern archaeologists use pinax as the general term for such votive panels, of which there are many examples from later periods, in various materials, but no other painted examples from so early.

The tablets are connected with the rural cult of the nymphs, which was widespread throughout ancient Greek religion. Stylistically and technically, the tablets are on par with other surviving Archaic paintings, namely Greek vase paintings and Greek-influenced tomb paintings from Ancient Etruria and Asia Minor.

References to wooden painted or inscribed votives at other Greek sanctuaries (e.g. Epidaurus), suggest that the Pitsa tablets belong to the types of votives available to the lower, or poorer, sections of population. Such simple votives may have been far more numerous originally, but the fact that they are made of perishable materials, whereas richer votives were of stone, bronze or precious metals, has led to their near-total disappearance from the archaeological record.

== Description ==
The tablets are thin wooden boards or panels, probably of pine, some 0.5 to 1 cm thick. These were covered with stucco (plaster, "white calcium sulphate dehydrate") and painted with pigments including "carbon black, calcium carbonate white, Egyptian blue, red and yellow ochre, cinnabar, orpiment and realgar". Their bright colours are surprisingly well preserved. Only eight colours (black, white, blue, red, green, yellow, purple and brown) are used, with no shading or gradation of any sort. Probably, the black contour outlines were drawn first and then filled in with colours.

Differences in styles suggest that different artists may have produced them, but perhaps from the same workshop. Technical analysis does not support significant differences in dating between the panels, which some had proposed on stylistic grounds. The panels were found some 60 metres from the cave entrance, piled on top of each other. There are two nail holes each in the top edges of the two largest panels, suggesting they had once been nailed to a wall or tree, and were perhaps already in a worn-out condition when stacked deep in the cave.

From 2013 on, extensive modern scientific research into the panels was conducted. The panels are discussed in the order in which they were found stacked, from top to bottom.

=== NAMA 16467, the ritual dance ===
This was the top panel in the stack in the cave, and the most exposed to the local conditions before it was excavated. It is 31.6 cm wide × 14 cm high. Only a corner retains all the layers of the painted surface, but ghostly traces can be seen over other parts, with imaging techniques giving further information. Parts of five female figures remain in the top right corner, and there were at least four more figures over the rest of the panel, one a bearded flute player. The women face each other in small groups, which is interpreted as a dance, festival or social gathering. Perhaps they are deities; there is writing above their heads, which may be their names, or possibly these are the names of donors. The figure furthest on the left appears to be seated on a throne; perhaps nymphs are dancing for an enthroned goddess.

The names are now able to be read much more clearly with infrared imaging, and there has been considerable discussion over them.

=== NAMA 16464, procession in honour of the nymphs ===
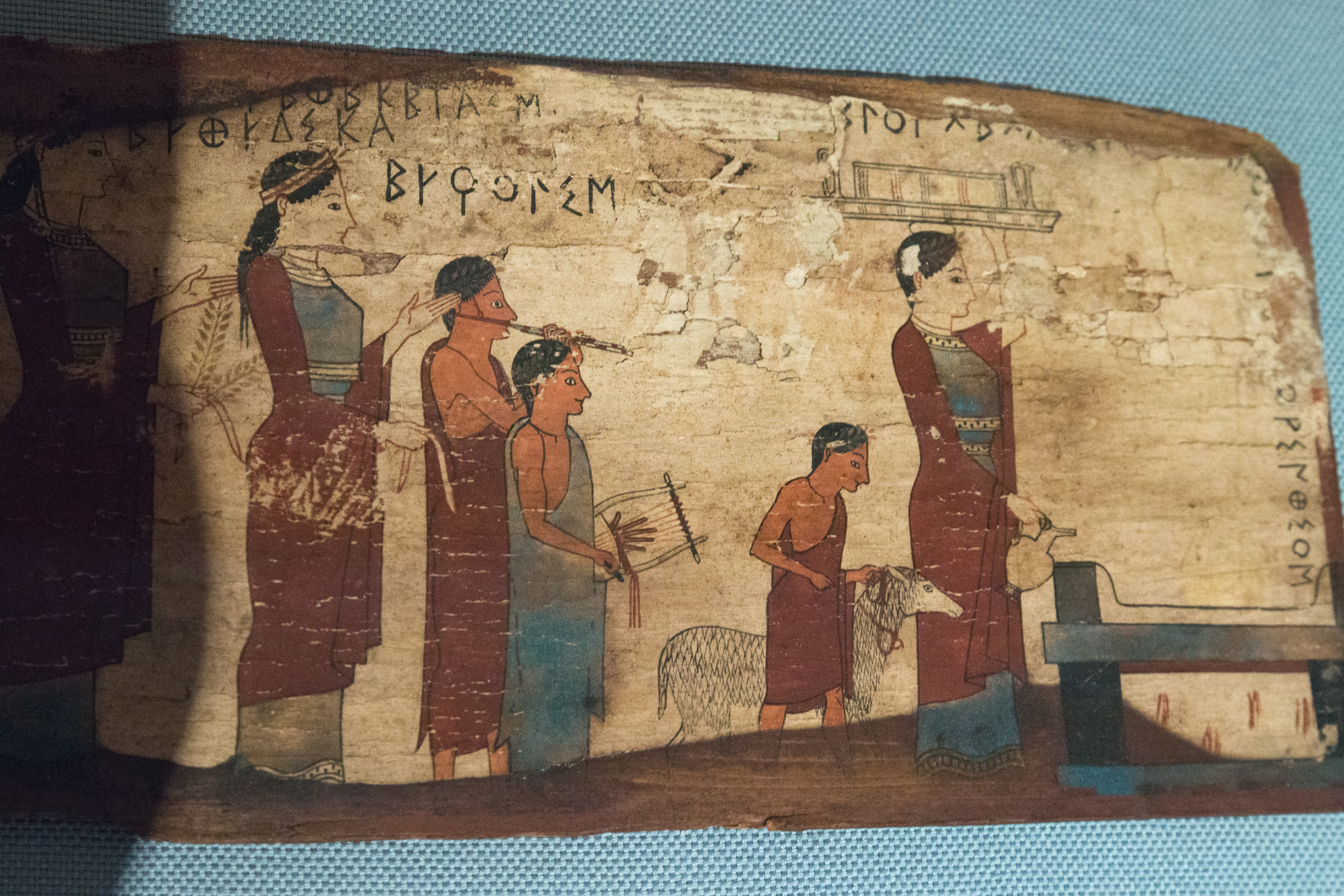
NAMA 16464, procession in honour of the nymphs, detail

This, the next panel in the stack, is the best-preserved and much the most famous panel. it is 32.3 cm wide and 15 cm high. It shows a family procession to an altar (at right), to sacrifice to the nymphs, including a lamb or sheep. The figures share a groundline, and are in profile, facing right. An adult male brings up the rear (at the left) and is the least well-preserved. There are three female figures, and three boys; the smallest and presumably youngest female is at the front, carrying a tray with sacrificial items balanced on her head, and a jug in her other hand. She is perhaps pouring onto the altar, on the sides of which the red vertical dashes probably represent blood. Next comes the smallest boy, bringing the lamb on a halter. Behind him two larger boys play a double flute and a lyre. Then two other women, of similar size, somewhat shorter than the male at the rear.

There are several inscriptions: two female names (Euthydika and Eukolis) above figures, part of a "votive formula" above these along the top at left, and on the extreme right an inscription running vertically which cannot all be read, but contains the adjective "Corinthian". This is presumed to refer to the donor, or possibly the painter.

=== NAMA 16465, three female figures ===
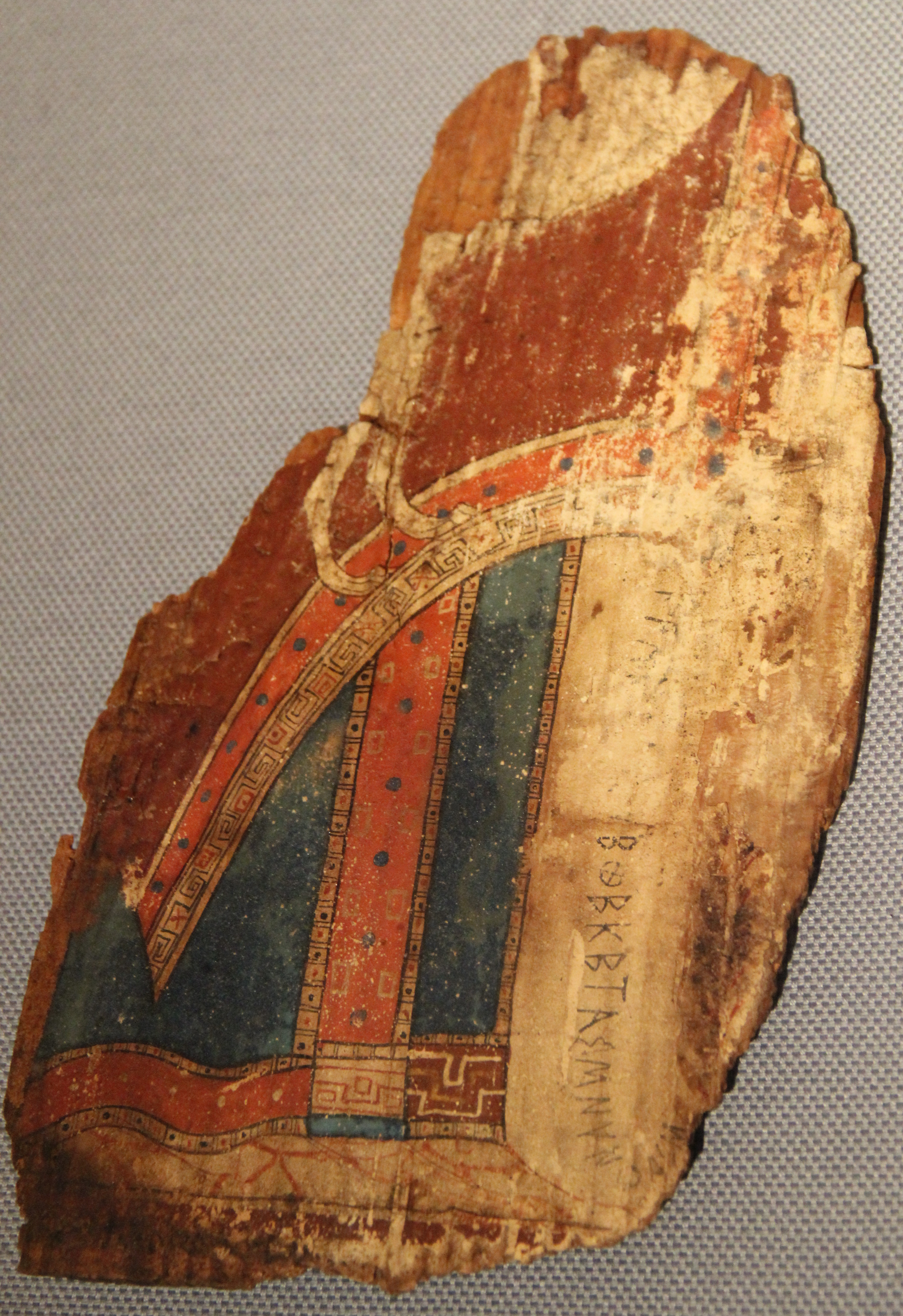
The fragment NAMA 16465

This is a smaller fragment, 14 cm wide and 23.3 cm high; although very incomplete it is therefore taller than the two more complete panels. It shows "the lower two thirds of a female triad with overlapping bodies, standing on a ground line facing right, dressed in chiton (or peplos) and covered by one mantle". An incomplete inscription shows it was dedicated to the nymphs. The clothes have elaborate decoration in geometric patterns, and "a white feline (only the forelegs and belly are preserved) is depicted atop the border of the arc formed by a himation".

=== NAMA 16466, Draped figures holding necklaces ===
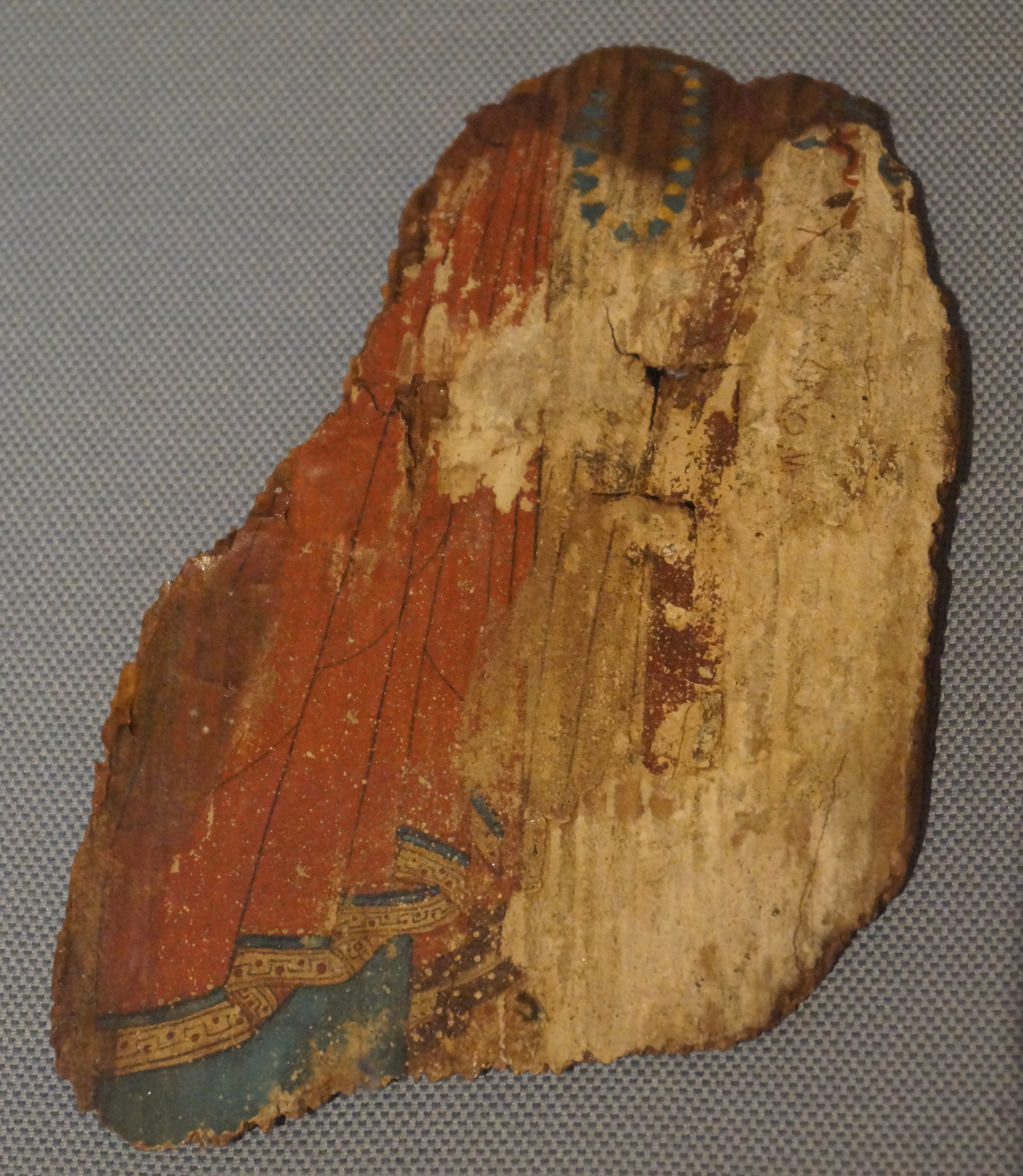
The fragment NAMA 16466

This was the lowest panel in the stack, measuring 25 cm high and 16.6 cm wide, a similar size to NAMA 16465. It also shows parts of the costumes of "a triad of richly draped overlapping figures facing to the right", one with a blue and yellow necklace, and near that snake-like forms. The depiction of the garments, with their folds and borders is detailed and "sophisticated".

== Iconography ==
The tablets depict religious scenes connected with the cult of the nymphs. One of the two near-complete examples shows a sacrifice to the nymphs. Three or more females, dressed in chiton and peplos, are approaching an altar to the right. They are accompanied by musicians playing the lyra and aulos. The person nearest the altar appears to be pouring a libation from a jug. A small figure behind her, perhaps a slave, is leading a lamb, the sacrificial victim. An inscription in the Corinthian alphabet names two woman dedicators, Euthydika and Eucholis and states that the tablet, or the depicted offering, is dedicated to the nymphs.

The second well-preserved tablet also has a written dedication to the nymphs and shows three partially overlapping female figures, perhaps the nymphs themselves.

== Pitsa Cave ==
The Pitsa cave extended to a depth of over 20 metres, with a number of chambers. It was in use as a cult centre "for the worship of chthonic deities, especially the nymphs and possibly Demeter, from ca. 700 BC into the Roman Imperial period". Apart from the painted panels, the Pitsa Cave produced large numbers of other finds, which are now mostly in the local Archaeological Museum of Sikyon, at the nearby ruined ancient city of Sicyon. As usual, objects in stone and pottery have survived best, and there are also finds in metal, especially bronze mirrors and coins. Many came from the same Archaic period as the panels, but others were from subsequent centuries, stretching into the Roman imperial period.

== Significance ==
Most ancient paintings that survived are either frescos or vase paintings. It is known that panel paintings were held in much higher regard, but very few of them have survived. The best known examples of ancient panel painting, the Fayum mummy portraits and the Severan Tondo, are of Roman date, and make use of artistic techniques developed in the centuries after the Pitsa Panels. These panels, probably preserved due to the unusual climatic conditions inside the cave, are by far the earliest examples of this technique to survive. As the only Archaic specimens, they represent virtually all the evidence for a whole style of art. Incidentally, the ancient Greeks believed that panel painting was invented in Sicyon, not far from Pitsa.
