= Panel painting =

Painting made on a flat panel made of wood

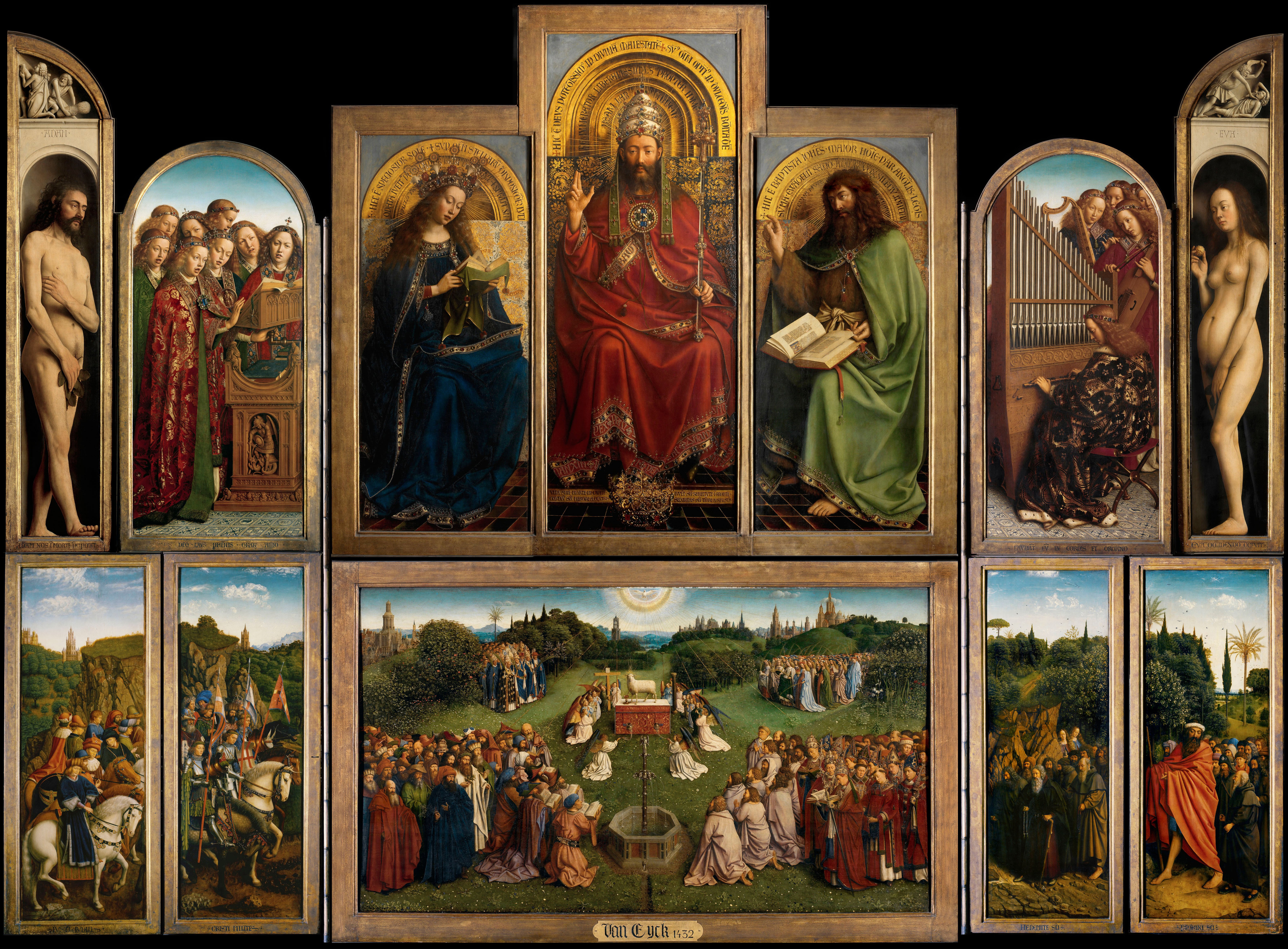
The Ghent Altarpiece by Jan van Eyck and Hubert van Eyck, 1432. A large altarpiece on panel. The outer wings are hinged, and painted on both sides.

A panel painting is a painting made on a flat panel of wood, either a single piece or a number of pieces joined together. Until canvas became the more popular support medium in the 16th century, panel painting was the normal method, when not painting directly onto a wall (fresco) or on vellum (used for miniatures in illuminated manuscripts). Wood panels were also used for mounting vellum paintings.

== History ==
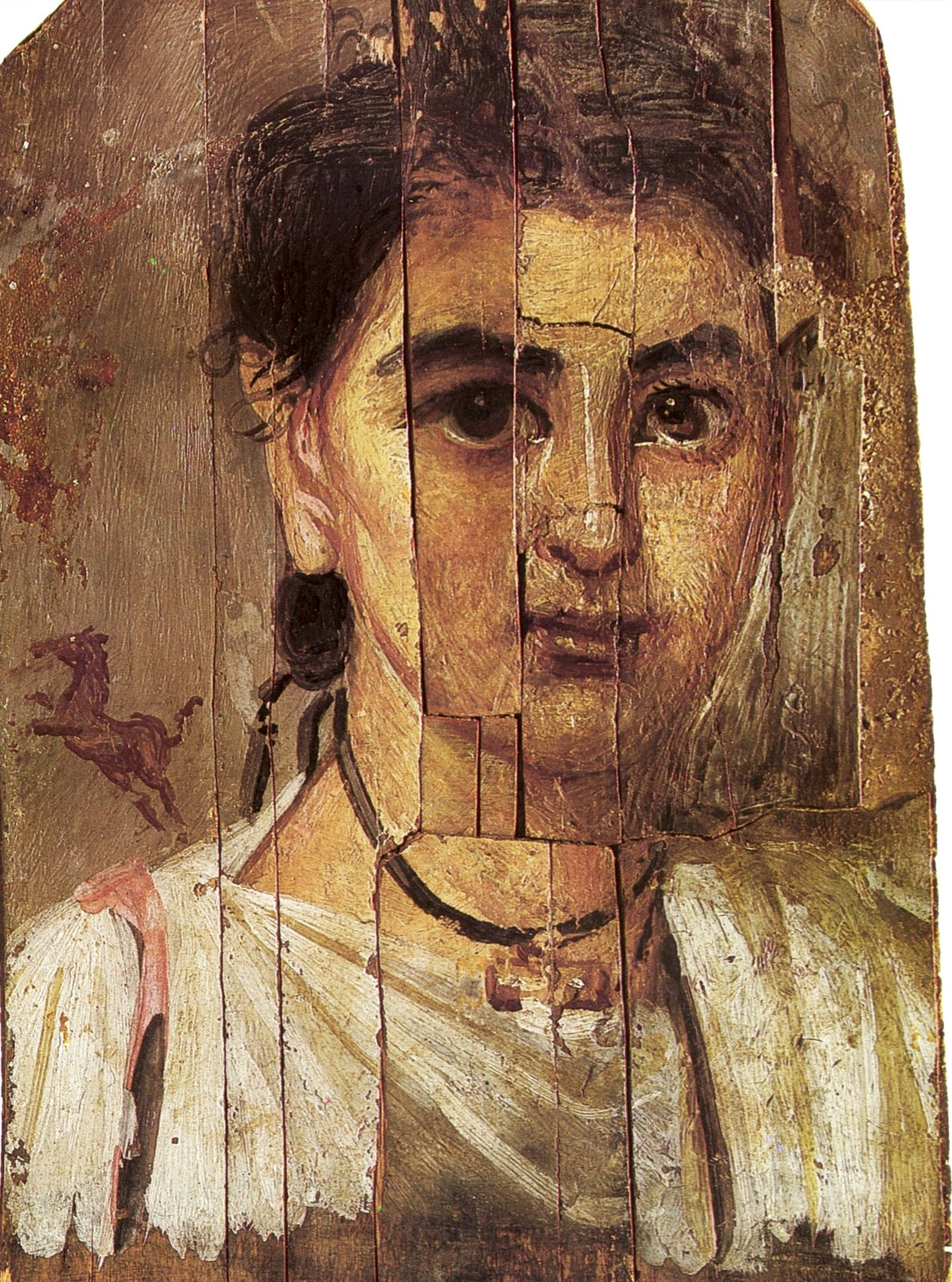
Fayum mummy portrait of boy in 2nd-century Greco-Roman Egypt. Encaustic on wood—note the cracks.

Panel painting is very old; it was a very prestigious medium in Greece and Rome, but only very few examples of ancient panel paintings have survived. A series of 6th century BC painted tablets from Pitsa (Greece) represent the oldest surviving Greek panel paintings. Most classical Greek paintings that were famous in their day seem to have been of a size comparable to smaller modern works – perhaps up to a half-length portrait size. However, for a generation in the second quarter of the fifth-century BC there was a movement, called the "new painting" and led by Polygnotus, for very large painted friezes, apparently painted on wood, decorating the interiors of public buildings with very large and complicated subjects containing numerous figures at least half life-size, and including battle scenes. We can only attempt to imagine what these looked like from some detailed literary descriptions and vase-paintings that appear to echo their compositions.

The first century BC to third century AD Fayum mummy portraits, preserved in the exceptionally dry conditions of Egypt, provide the bulk of surviving panel painting from the Imperial Roman period – about 900 face or bust portraits survive. The Severan Tondo, also from Roman Egypt (about 200 AD), is one of the handful of non-funerary Graeco-Roman specimens to survive. Wood has always been the normal support for the Icons of Byzantine art and the later Orthodox traditions, the earliest of which (all in Saint Catherine's Monastery) date from the 5th or 6th centuries, and are the oldest panel paintings which seem to be of the highest contemporary quality. Encaustic and tempera are the two techniques used in antiquity. Encaustic largely ceased to be used after the early Byzantine icons.

Although there seem from literary references to have been some panel paintings produced in Western Europe through the centuries between Late Antiquity and the Romanesque period, and Byzantine icons were imported, there are next to no survivals in an unaltered state. In the 12th century panel painting experienced a revival. Altarpieces seem to have begun to be used during the 11th century, with the possible exception of a few earlier examples. They became more common in the 13th century because of new liturgical practices—the priest and congregation were now on the same side of the altar, leaving the space behind the altar free for the display of a holy image—and thus altar decorations were in demand. The habit of placing decorated reliquaries of saints on or behind the altar, as well as the tradition of decorating the front of the altar with sculptures or textiles, preceded the first altarpieces.

The earliest forms of panel painting were dossals (altar backs), altar fronts and crucifixes. All were painted with religious images, commonly the Christ or the Virgin, with the saints appropriate to the dedication of the church, and the local town or diocese, or to the donor. Donor portraits including members of the donor's family are also often shown, usually kneeling to the side. They were for some time a cheaper alternative to the far more prestigious equivalents in metalwork, decorated with gems, enamels, and perhaps ivory figures, most of which have long been broken up for their valuable materials. Painted panels for altars are most numerous in Spain, especially Catalonia, which is explained by the poverty of the country at this time, as well as the absence of Reformation-era iconoclasm.

The 13th and 14th centuries in Italy were a great period of panel painting, mostly altarpieces or other religious works. However, it is estimated that of all the panel paintings produced there, 99.9 percent have been lost. The vast majority of Early Netherlandish paintings are on panel, and these include most of the earliest portraits, such as those by Jan van Eyck, and some other secular scenes. However, one of the earliest surviving oils on canvas is a French Madonna with angels of about 1410 in the Gemäldegalerie, Berlin, which is very early indeed for oil painting also. In these works the frame and panel are sometimes a single piece of wood, as with Portrait of a Man (Self Portrait?) by van Eyck (National Gallery, London), where the frame was also painted, including an inscription done illusionistically to resemble carving.

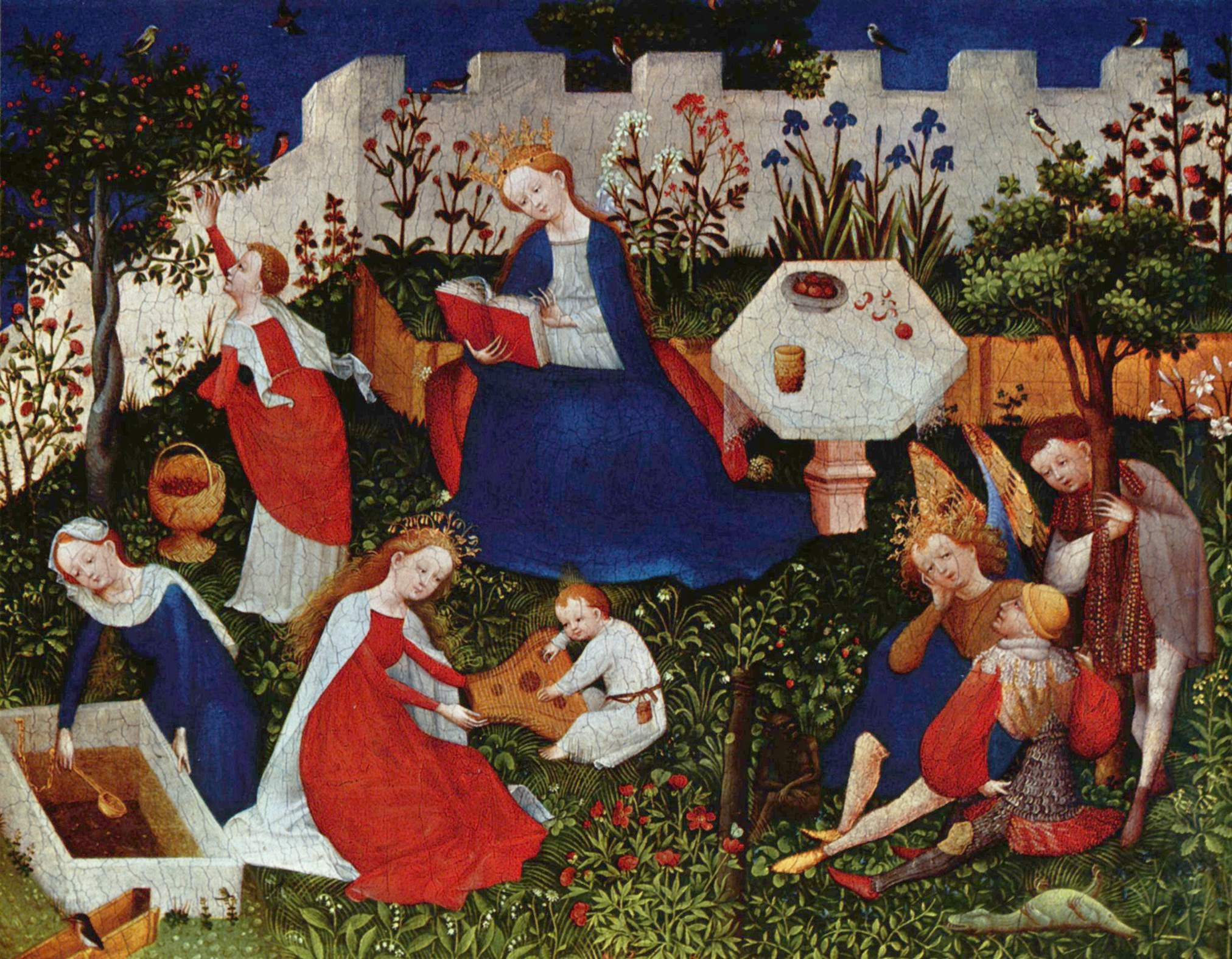
The Frankfurt Paradiesgärtlein, a German panel painting from c. 1410

By the 15th century with the increased wealth of Europe, and later the appearance of humanism, and a changing attitude about the function of art and patronage, panel painting went in new directions. Secular art opened the way to the creation of chests, painted beds, birth trays and other furniture. Many such works are now detached and hung framed on walls in museums. Many double-sided wings of altarpieces (see picture at top) have also been sawn into two one-sided panels.

Canvas took over from panel in Italy by the first half of the 16th century, a change led by Mantegna and the artists of Venice (which made the finest canvas at this point, for sails). In the Netherlands the change took about a century longer, and panel paintings remained common, especially in Northern Europe, even after the cheaper and more portable canvas had become the main support medium. The young Rubens and many other painters preferred it for the greater precision that could be achieved with a totally solid support, and many of his most important works also used it, even for paintings over four metres long in one dimension. His panels are of notoriously complicated construction, containing as many as seventeen pieces of wood (Het Steen, National Gallery, London). For smaller cabinet paintings, copper sheets (often old printmaking plates) were another rival support, from the end of the 16th century, used by many artists including Adam Elsheimer. Many Dutch painters of the Golden Age used panel for their small works, including Rembrandt on occasion. In the early seventeenth century, certain painters occasionally employed wooden supports, such as Caravaggio in his David with the Head of Goliath (Vienna), executed on a reused poplar panel. By the 18th century it had become unusual to paint on panel, except for small works to be inset into furniture, and the like. But, for example, The National Gallery in London has two Goya portraits on panel.

Many other painting traditions also painted, and still paint, on wood, but the term is usually only used to refer to the Western tradition described above.

== Panel construction and preparation ==
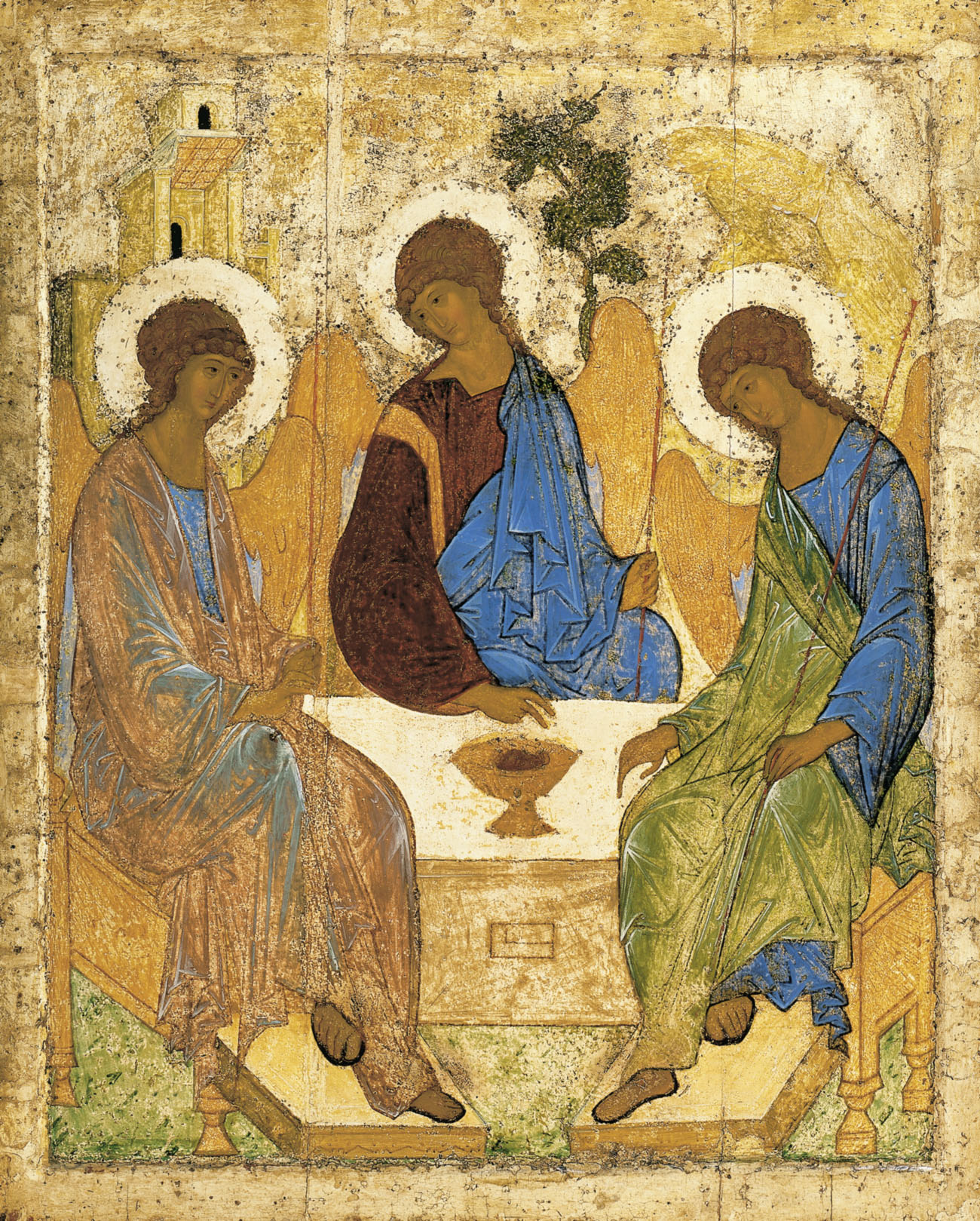
Russian icon by Andrei Rublev, early 15th century, on a three-piece panel. The raised edges are probably gesso rather than wood.

The technique is known to us through Cennino Cennini's "The Craftsman's Handbook" (Il libro dell' arte) published in 1390, and other sources. It changed little over the centuries. It was a laborious and painstaking process:

- A carpenter would construct a solid wood piece the size of the panel needed. Usually a radial cut piece was preferred (across rather than along the length of the tree; the opposite of most timber cuts), with the outer sapwood excluded. In Italy it was usually seasoned poplar, willow or linden. It would be planed and sanded and if needed, joined with other pieces to obtain the desired size and shape.
- The wood would be coated with a mixture of animal-skin glues and resin and covered with linen (the mixture and linen combination was known as a "size"); this might be done by a specialist, or in the artists studio.
- Once the size had dried, layer upon layer of gesso would be applied, each layer sanded down before the next applied, sometimes as many as 15 layers, before a smooth hard surface emerged, not unlike ivory. This stage was not necessarily done after the 16th century, or darker grounds were used.

== Painting techniques ==
Once the panel construction was complete, the design was laid out, usually in charcoal.

The usual ancient painting technique was encaustic, used at Al-Fayum and in the earliest surviving Byzantine icons, which are at the Saint Catherine's Monastery. This uses heated wax as the medium for the pigments.

This was replaced before the end of first millennium by tempera, which uses an egg-yolk medium. Using small brushes dipped in a mixture of pigment and egg-yolk, the paint was applied in very small, almost transparent, brushstrokes. Thin layers of paint would be used to create volumetric forms.

By the beginning of the 15th century, oil painting was developed. This was more tolerant, and allowed the exceptional detail of Early Netherlandish art. This used a very painstaking multi-layered technique, where the painting, or a particular part of it, had to be left for a couple of days for one layer to dry before the next was applied.

== Conservation and scientific analysis ==
A View of Het Steen in the Early Morning, 131 x 229 cm, c. 1636. A large Rubens panel painting, made out of 18 individually added pieces.

Wood panels, especially if kept with too little humidity, often warp and crack with age, and from the 19th century, when reliable techniques were developed, many have been transferred to canvas or modern board supports. This can result in damage to the paint layer, as historical transfer techniques were rather brutal.

Paintings on wood panel that were expanded, such as Rubens' A View of Het Steen in the Early Morning (which consists of eighteen separate panels, seventeen added as the artist enlarged his composition), often suffer greatly over time. Each warps in its own way, tearing the overall piece apart at the seams.

Wood panel is now rather more useful to art historians than canvas, and in recent decades there has been great progress in extracting this information. Many fakes have been discovered and mistaken datings corrected. Specialists can identify the tree species used, which varied according to the area where the painting was made. Carbon-dating techniques can give an approximate date-range (typically to a range of about 20 years), and dendrochronology sequences have been developed for the main source areas of timber for panels. Italian paintings used local or sometimes Dalmatian wood, most often poplar, but including chestnut, walnut, oak and other woods. The Netherlands ran short of local timber early in the 15th century, and most Early Netherlandish masterpieces are Baltic oak, often Polish, cut north of Warsaw and shipped down the Vistula, across the Baltic to the Netherlands. Southern German painters often used pine, and mahogany imported into Europe was used by later painters, including examples by Rembrandt and Goya.

In theory, dendro-chronology gives an exact felling date, but in practice allowances have to be made for a seasoning period of several years, and a small panel may be from the centre of the tree, with no way of knowing how many rings outside the panel there were. So dendro-chronological conclusions tend to be expressed as a "terminus post quem" or an earliest possible date, with a tentative estimate of an actual date, that may be twenty or more years later.

The so-called Panel Paintings Initiative is a multi-year project in collaboration between the Getty Conservation Institute, the Getty Foundation, and the J. Paul Getty Museum. The Panel Paintings Initiative is a response to the growing recognition that significant collections of paintings on wood panels may be at risk in coming decades due to the waning numbers of conservators and craftspeople with the highly specialized skills required for the conservation of these complex works of art.

== Types of wood ==
Artists would typically use wood native to the region. Albrecht Dürer (1471–1528), for example, painted on poplar when he was in Venice and on oak when in the Netherlands and southern Germany. Leonardo da Vinci (1452–1519) used oak for his paintings in France; Hans Baldung Grien (1484/85–1545) and Hans Holbein (1497/98–1543) used oak while working in southern Germany and England. In the Middle Ages, spruce and lime were used in the Upper Rhine and often in Bavaria. Outside of the Rhineland, softwood (such as pinewood) was mainly used. Of a group of twenty Norwegian altar frontals from the Gothic period (1250–1350) fourteen were made of fir, two of oak, and four of pine (Kaland 1982). Large altars made in Denmark during the fifteenth century used oak for the figures as well as for the painted wings. Lime was popular with Albrecht Altdorfer (c. 1480–1538), Baldung Grien, Christoph Amberger (d. 1562), Dürer, and Lucas Cranach the Elder (1472–1553). Cranach often used beech wood—an unusual choice. In Northern Europe, poplar is very rarely found, but walnut and chestnut are not uncommon. In the northeast and south, coniferous trees such as spruce, and various types of fir, and pine have been used. Fir wood is shown to have been used in the Upper and Middle Rhine, Augsburg, Nuremberg, and Saxony. Pinewood was used mainly in Tirol and beech wood only in Saxony. However, in general, oak was the most common substrate used for panel making in the Low Countries, northern Germany, and the Rhineland around Cologne. In France, until the seventeenth century, most panels were made from oak, although a few made of walnut and poplar have been found.

The oak favored as a support by the painters of the northern school was, however, not always of local origin. In the seventeenth century about four thousand full-grown oak trees were needed to build a medium-sized merchant ship; thus, imported wood was necessary. Oak coming from Königsberg as well as Gdańsk is often found among works by Flemish and Dutch artists from the 15th through the 17th centuries; the origin can be established by the patterns of growth rings. In the last decade of the seventeenth century, Wilhelmus Beurs, a Dutch writer on painting techniques, considered oak to be the most useful wooden substrate on which to paint. However, exceptions are seen rather early in the seventeenth century: sometimes walnut, pearwood, cedarwood, or Indian woods were used. Mahogany was already in use by a number of painters during the first decades of the seventeenth century and was used often in the Netherlands in the nineteenth century. Even so, when canvas or copper was not used, the main oeuvre of the northern school was painted on oak panels.

== See also ==
- Cradling (art restoration)
- Gothic art
- Medieval art
- Triptych
