= Severan Tondo =

Roman panel painting

Coordinates: 52.519°N 13.398°E

The Severan Tondo
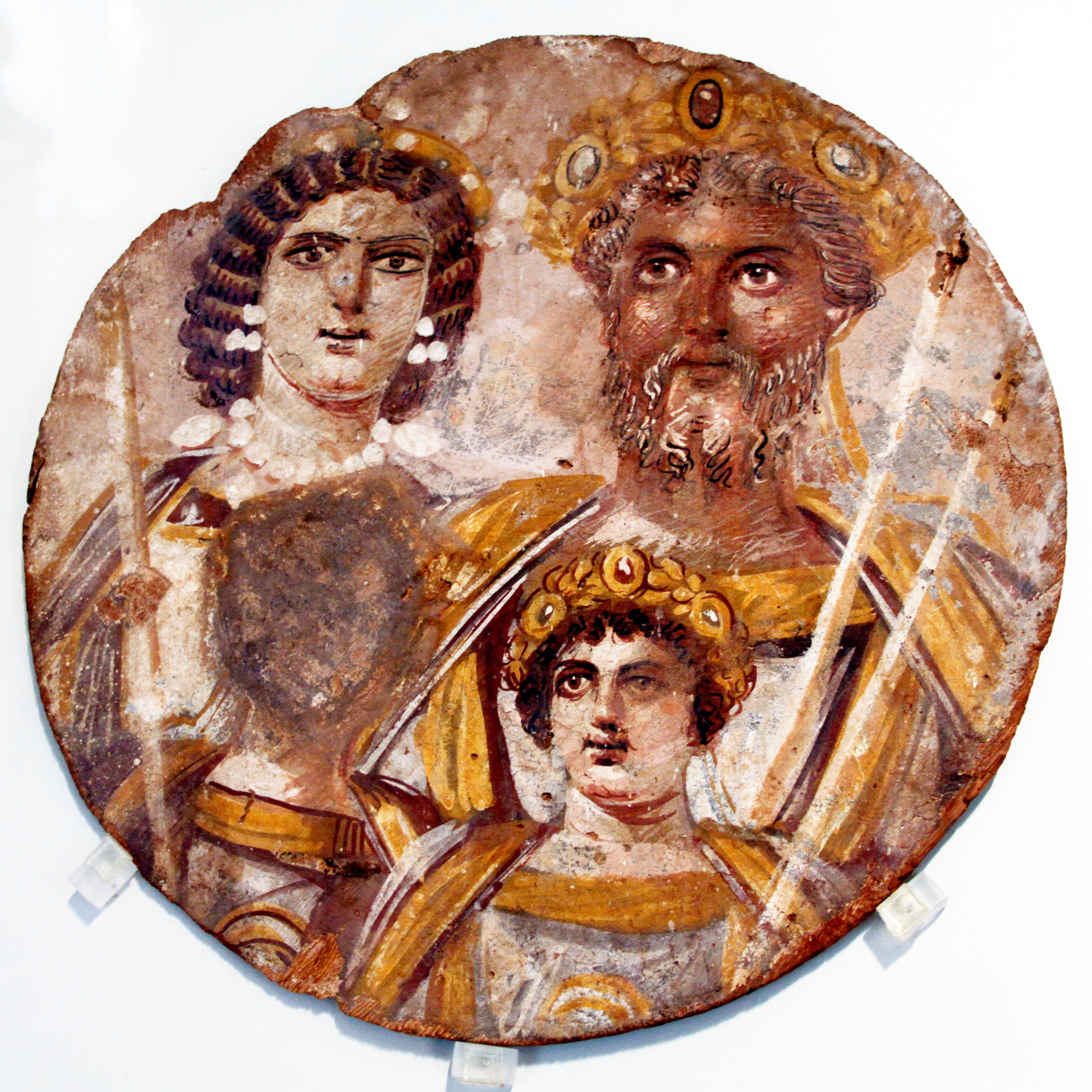
- Year: Early 3rd century AD
- Dimensions: 30.5 cm diameter (12.0 in)
- Location: Antikensammlung, Altes Museum, Berlin

The Severan Tondo or Berlin Tondo is a circular wooden panel portraying the Roman emperor Septimius Severus (r. 193–211) with his wife, the augusta Julia Domna, and their two sons and co-augusti Caracalla (r. 198–217) and Geta (r. 209–211) depicting the first two generations of the imperial Severan dynasty, whose members ruled the Roman Empire in the late 2nd and early 3rd centuries. The face of Geta, one of the two brothers, has been deliberately erased in connection with his damnatio memoriae after his death in c. 212. The panel was painted during the reign of Roman Emperor Septimius Severus before c. 205 AD and measures 30.5 cm wide. The Severan Tondo is one of the few preserved examples of panel painting from classical antiquity to attest to the deliberate manipulation of a portrait for the purpose of dishonoring an individual.

On the viewer's right is Septimius Severus, and to the left Julia Domna. In front of them are the boys Caracalla and Geta. All wear jeweled gold wreaths and imperial insignia, some details of which have been lost. The dating of the piece has caused some debate among scholars, with the final consensus being c. 200 AD. The tondo has many stylistic connections to Fayum Mummy portraiture including materials and artistic elements, and its production has been located in the Fayum district of Egypt during this period. Later on the tondo re-emerged from the antiquities trade; the provenance is unknown before entering the Antikensammlung Berlin (inventory number 31329) in the 20th century. It is now in the Altes Museum.

== Description ==
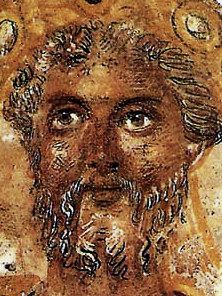
Detail of Septimius

The work is a tempera, or egg-based painting, on a tondo, with a diameter of 30.5 centimetres (12.0 in). It portrays the Imperial family wearing gold wreaths embellished with elaborate jewels, white robes trimmed with gold, and a holding sceptres which suggests the status of true eastern monarchs. Julia Domna has her distinctive hairstyle, crimped into parallel locks, possibly a style from her home in Syria, and perhaps a wig. It is commonly assumed that Julia Domna introduced the custom of wearing wigs into Roman society, evidence points to a predecessor introducing use of wigs in portraiture. Although the portrait depicts Julia as being notably paler than Severus, the subjects' true complexions are probably not accurately represented, as artistic conventions of the era often depicted women with fairer skin and men with darker skin.

Most scholars believe it is Septimius's son Geta whose face has been removed through a deliberate act of iconoclasm, most likely after his murder by Caracalla's Praetorian Guard and the ensuing damnatio memoriae. However, it is also possible that Geta (as the younger son) is the smaller boy, and it is Caracalla's face which was eradicated, perhaps as a compensatory retaliation for Caracalla's mass execution of young Alexandrian men in the year 215.

The tondo was probably created in a square or rectangular shape, and later cut into a circle. The loss of some of the original painting is most apparent with the sceptres that the males are holding: the upper parts, once adorned with imperial symbols, are now missing. It seems likely that the panel was cut down in modern times to improve its saleability on the art market.

== Historical context ==
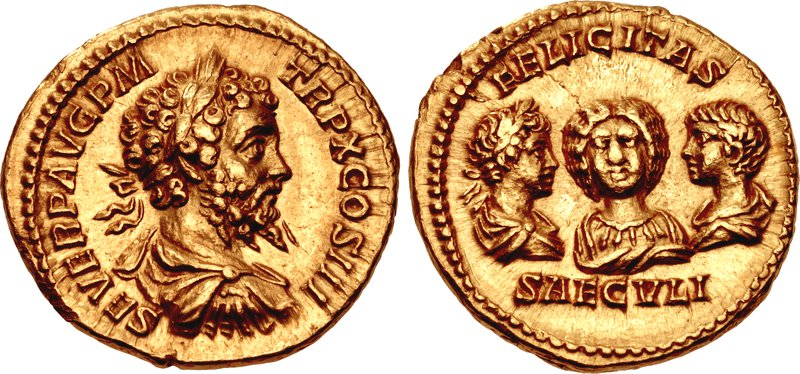
Another example of dynastic portraits on an aureus of Septimius Severus, minted in 202. The reverse feature the portraits of Geta (right), Julia Domna (centre), and Caracalla (left).

The Severan Dynasty lasted from 193 to 235 AD. Septimius Severus, the founder of the dynasty, was born in Lepcis Magna, Tripolitania (present-day Libya) in 145 AD. Severus gained power and status in 190 AD, as he rose within Senate ranks under Marcus Aurelius. As Severus gained power, he secured numerous governorships. He held those of Gallia Lugdunensis, Upper Pannonia, and Sicily. After the murder of the emperor Commodus in 192, and the short lived succession by Pertinax, Severus seized power with the assistance of his troops in 193. The following four years Severus spent fending off opposition from his rivals. Finally, in 197, the empire was secured in his sole authority. After the empire was secured, Severus led many successful military campaigns, the most famous of them being against the Parthians.

After Severus's death in February of 211, the empire was supposed to be jointly ruled by his sons, Caracalla and Geta. In December that year, Caracalla had Geta murdered and was the sole ruler until he was also murdered in 217. The dynasty would continue to have a tumultuous line of succession until its end in 235.

=== Dating ===
Dating the tondo has caused some debate among scholars, with the interpretation of elements contributing to the dating of the piece, as well as the Serapis portrait style. Some argue about the presence of corkscrew locks on the upper portion of Severus’s forehead. The corkscrew locks, if present, indicate that the date of this piece follows the commencement of Serapis portrait type. Some scholars date the piece to be between 202 and 203 AD, because the Serapis style of portraiture is usually accepted as starting in 204. The evidence points to the tondo being a precursor to the Serapis portrait type. Both Geta and Caracalla are pictured wearing crowns, this indicates that the painting came after 198, the year that Geta became Caesar. Severus doesn't have signs of age in the tondo, which dates it before 202; Severus’s official portraiture first started to display signs of age in 202. Also, Caracalla, born in 188, is depicted as a youth, indicating a date before about 205, when a more mature portrait style was introduced for him. Along with coin evidence and the dating of the Egyptian trip, the family portrait is now assumed to have been constructed between 199 and 200.

=== Damnatio memoriae ===
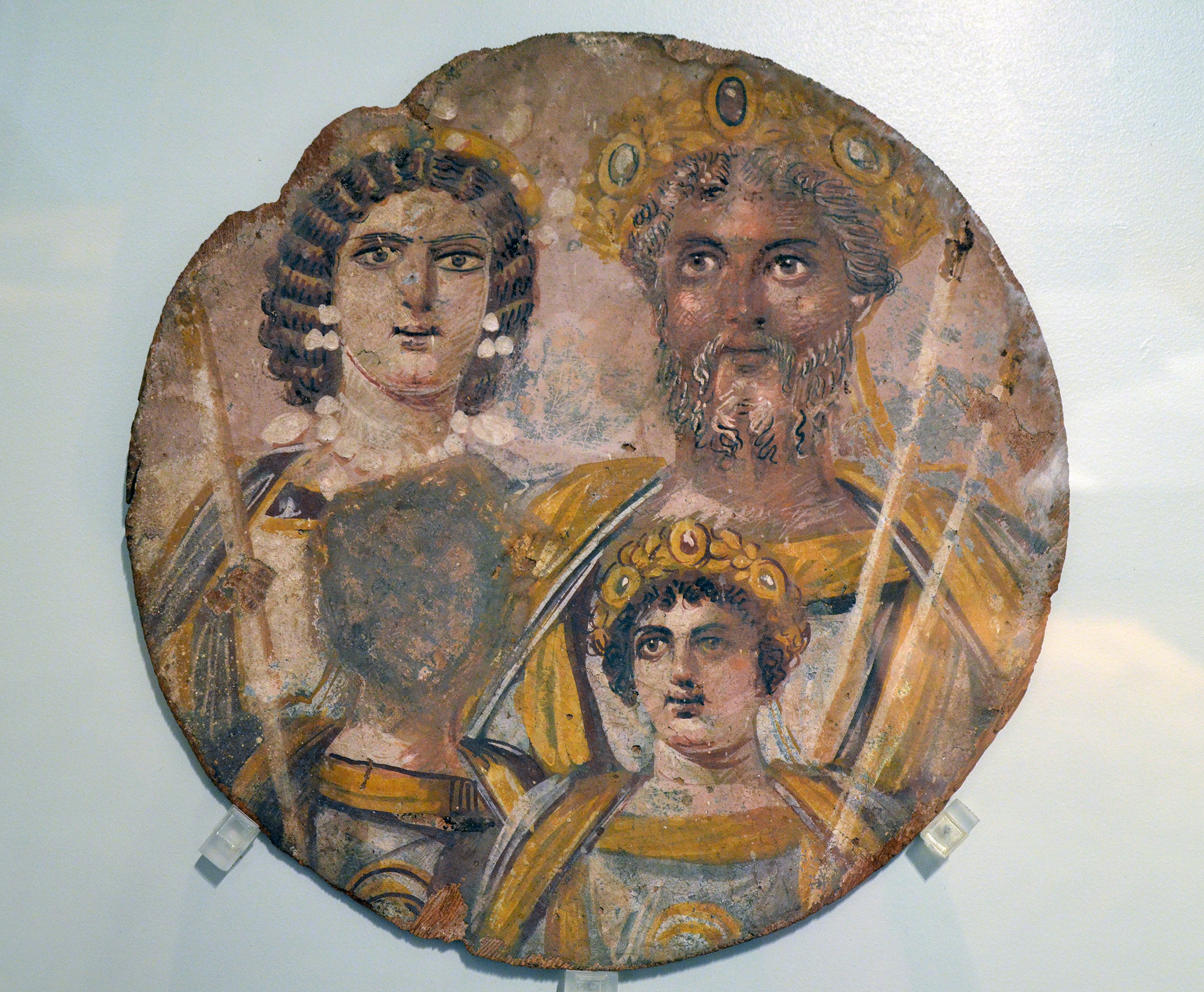
Another image of the tondo, better for detail

After his murder, Geta was subjected to damnatio memoriae. In this official action, the Senate declared against his memory. This led to great removal, defacement, and erasure of Geta throughout the entire Roman empire. The Severan Tondo serves as one of the best examples of the official damnatio memoriae subjected to Geta's figure.

The concept of damnatio memoriae was at its pinnacle during the Severan dynasty, which lasted forty-two-years. The use of damnatio memoriae against members and rivals of the imperial family happened numerous times over the course of the Severan dynasty's rule. Some examples of imperial family members and political rivals who were officially sanctioned with some form of damnatio memoriae included: Didius Julianus, Plautilla, Clodius Albinus, Elagabalus, Julia Soemias, and Pescennius Niger. The tondo is one of the only surviving pieces of artwork which illustrates physical defacement in an act of damnatio memoriae; the act of smearing mud, offal, paint or even excrement was recorded as a practice in ancient sources.

The tondo may have functioned as an icon display for either a public or private setting, perhaps even functioning as a relic for the imperial cult. It may have been a way for the owner to profess loyalty to the imperial family and ruling dynasty; this would have been an act of pietas. The defacement of Geta's figure in the tondo would have continued the owner's private expression of loyalty. By removing Geta's figure from the tondo, the owner would be able to continue to support the new emperor, Caracalla, and the legacy of Septimius Severus and Julia Domna. This display of damnatio memoriae of Geta's image shows that this practice of defacement did not only occur on public monuments and artworks, but in private settings as well. Geta's name and title, along with his image, were erased from almost every inscription pertaining to him. The inscriptions untouched total approximately thirty-one percent. The large number of images and inscriptions defaced in damnatio memoriae of Geta indicate that the Roman army may have been instrumental in the official act of erasing Geta. Unlike Geta, when Caracalla was murdered, he was not subjected to an official damnatio memoriae since he was well liked by the soldiers. However, the Senate did not care for him and labeled him a tyrant; so to appease some of the Senators, the new emperor Macrinus quietly removed some of his images from public displays.

== Style ==
The Severan art period is defined by the civil war that took place during the establishment of their dynasty. To help with the transition of power and their public image, the Severan imperial family expertly preserved the earlier Antonine period in the process of associated iconography. Septimius Severus needed to overcome the uncertainty of succession by creating a strong dynastic line through portraits. This was also accomplished with a standardization of the imperial portraiture, which began in the third century with the tondo, and would become the norm in the fourth century. Some elements include the non-engaging oversized eyes, frontal placement of the figures, and the details of upper class dress. Severan portraiture during Septimius Severus's reign was categorized by two distinct styles: Antonine-inspired, and one that combined the emperor's image with Serapis, a Greco-Egyptian god. After his death, Caracalla would initialize the departure from the Classicizing style and Greek traditions into what would become the style of the Late Antique period.

=== Stylistic connections ===
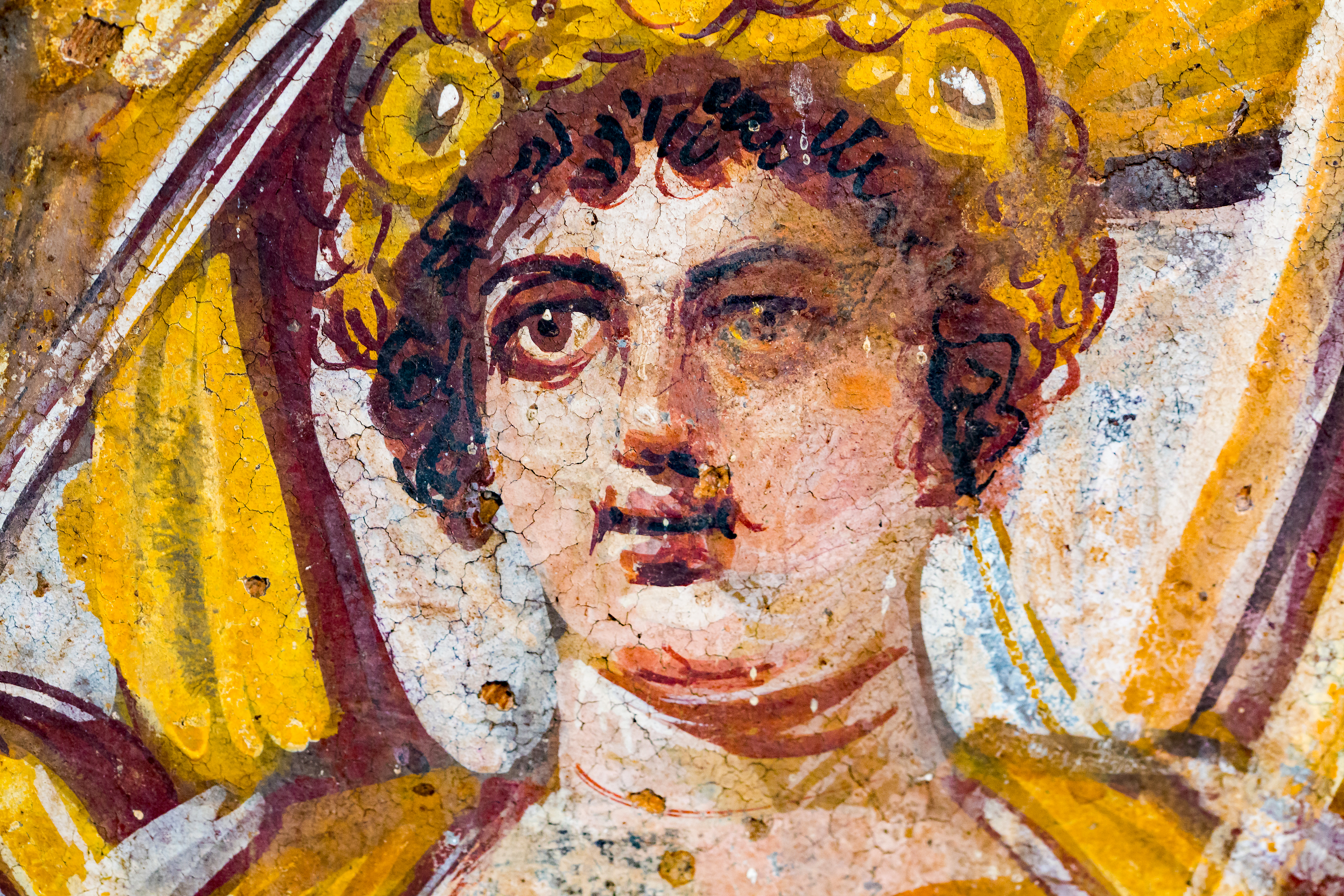
Detail of Caracalla

The painting of the tondo on a wooden panel with tempera paints is consistent with that of Fayum mummy portraits style. There are stylistic connections such as the addition of jewelry and wreaths in the tondo. This was an important element that displayed cultural identity and religious practices in Fayum portraiture. The use of the established Greek four-color palette of white, red, yellow, and black and a single light source are another similarity between Fayum portraits and the Severan Tondo. While many of the surviving Fayum portraits did pertain to burial or remembrance, some examples differ, such as the Severan Tondo. The Severan Tondo could have been displayed on a public building in a Fayum town. It may have been painted to celebrate the visit of Septimius Severus to Egypt in 199, following his military victories against the Parthian Empire the previous year, and before his campaigns in North Africa in 203. The connection to Fayum style portraiture places this with the art of upper-middle class Roman Egypt, which would be home to a mixture of Egyptian, Greek, and Roman identifying people. The artist who created the Severan Tondo may have been primarily employed as a Fayum mummy portrait artist, which could explain the stylistic connections of this work to that of Fayum mummy portraiture.

== Function ==
The image is an example of imperial portraits that were mass-produced to be displayed in offices and public buildings throughout the Roman Empire; as part of Roman legal procedure, some documents had to be signed in front of an image of the emperor, which gave them the same status as if signed in his actual presence. With each change of emperor, the portrait would have been discarded or replaced. Since wood is an organic material and does not normally survive, the Severan Tondo remains, so far, the only surviving specimen of this type of painting. Owning such a piece would demonstrate pietas and loyalty to the ruling dynasty.

== Provenance ==
The history of the painting after its creation is not known until the Antikensammlung Berlin acquired it in 1932 from an art dealer in Paris. It is in the Altes Museum, one of the Berlin State Museums (Staatliche Museen zu Berlin).

== See also ==
- Pitsa panels
- Fayum mummy portraits

== Bibliography ==
- Antikenmuseum Berlin; Wolf-Dieter Heilmeyer (1988). Die ausgestellten Werke (in German). Berlin: Staatliche Museen Preußischer Kulturbesitz. p. 373.
