= Pinax =

Ancient Greek votive tablet

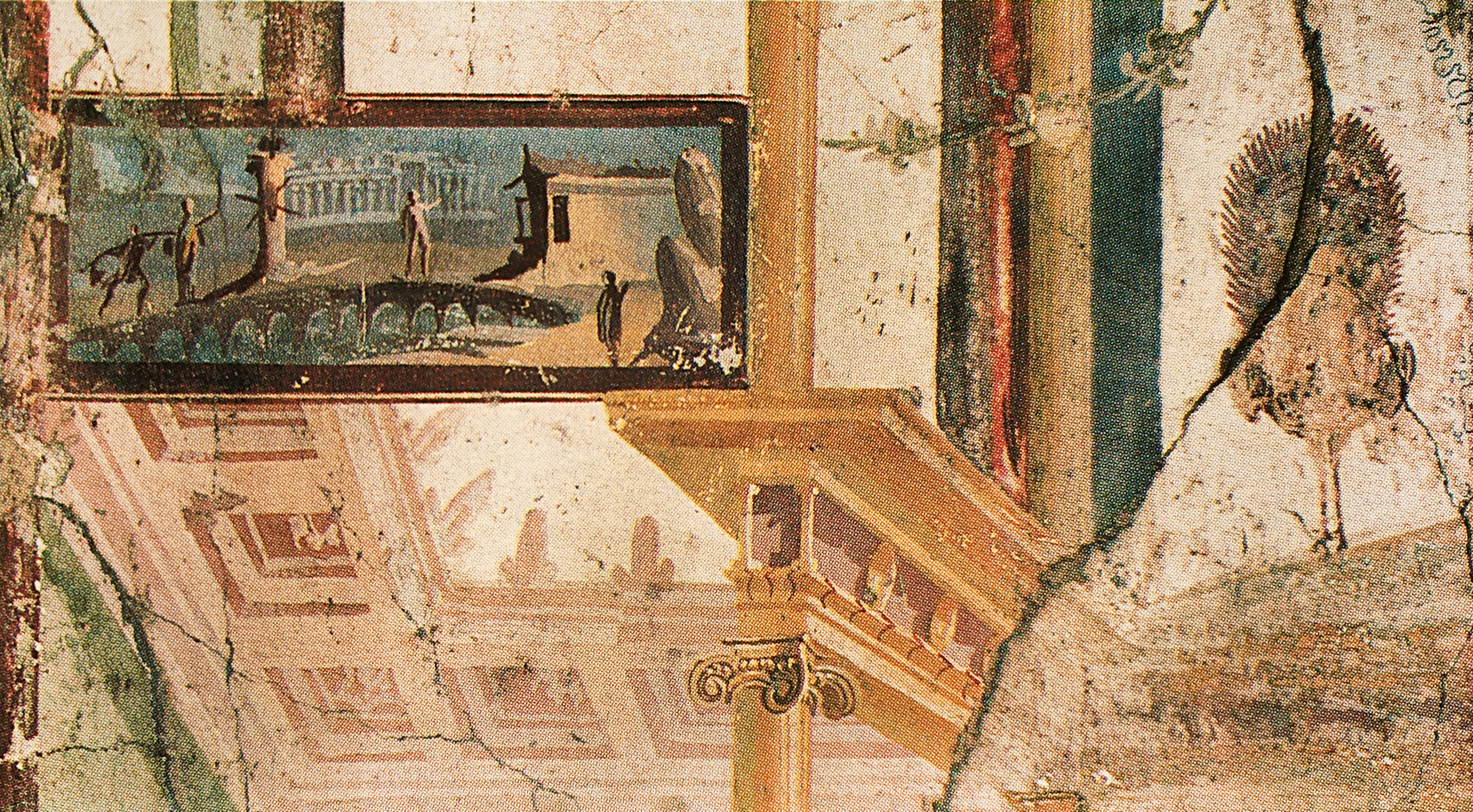
Pinax on the south wall of the exedra in the House of the Prince of Naples in Pompeii

In the modern study of the culture of ancient Greece and Magna Graecia, a pinax (Greek: πίναξ; pl.: pinakes, πίνακες, meaning 'board') is a votive tablet of painted wood, or terracotta, marble or bronze relief that served as a votive object deposited in a sanctuary or as a memorial affixed within a burial chamber. Such pinakes feature in the classical collections of most comprehensive museums.

In the Third and Fourth Style of ancient Roman mural painting, a pinax was a painted framed picture usually in the main zone of the wall surface.

== Other uses ==
To the ancient Greeks pinax seems also to have been a general term for a plate, but this is generally not followed in modern archaeological usage. In daily life pinax might equally denote a wax-covered writing tablet. In Christian contexts, painted icons ("images") are pinakes. In the theatre of ancient Greece, they were images probably usually painted on cloth, but also carved either in stone or wood, that were hung behind, and sometimes below, the stage area as scenery, or as permanent decoration. The term pinacotheca for a picture gallery derives from such usages.

== Materials and use ==
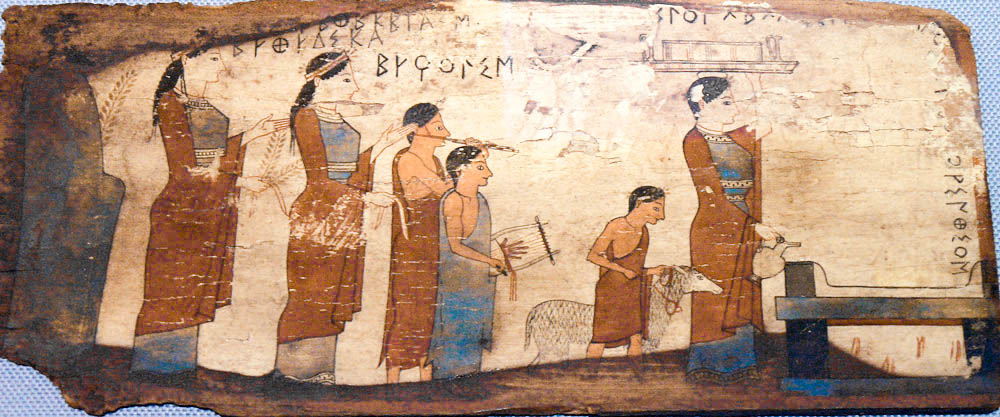
One of the Pitsa panels, 6th century BCE, paint on wood, showing an animal sacrifice in Corinth

When they are recovered by archaeologists, painted wooden pinakes have usually lost all but faint traces of their painted images – the Pitsa panels being the outstanding exception. Moulded terracotta pinakes were also brightly painted. Marble pinakes were individually carved, but terracotta ones were impressed in molds, and bronze ones might be repeatedly cast from a model from which wax and resin impressions were made, in the technique called lost-wax casting.

A few elaborate gold plaques have survived from the 7th century BC, many made in Rhodes, with deity figures, especially Artemis, shown in an orientalizing Daedalic style.

They often have two holes for a suspension cord, and are shown in vase-paintings both hanging on temple walls, and also suspended from trees in the sanctuary area. The Roman architect Vitruvius mentions the pinakes in the cellas of temples, and even in the possession of private persons. Such a collection was a pinakothek, which is a modern German term for an art museum, such as the Alte Pinakothek of Munich.

Callimachus, the Alexandrian poet and scholar at the Library of Alexandria, formed a kind of index, or "map picture" of the library's contents, which he named Pinakes, a term that continued in use in bibliographic catalogs.

== Large finds ==
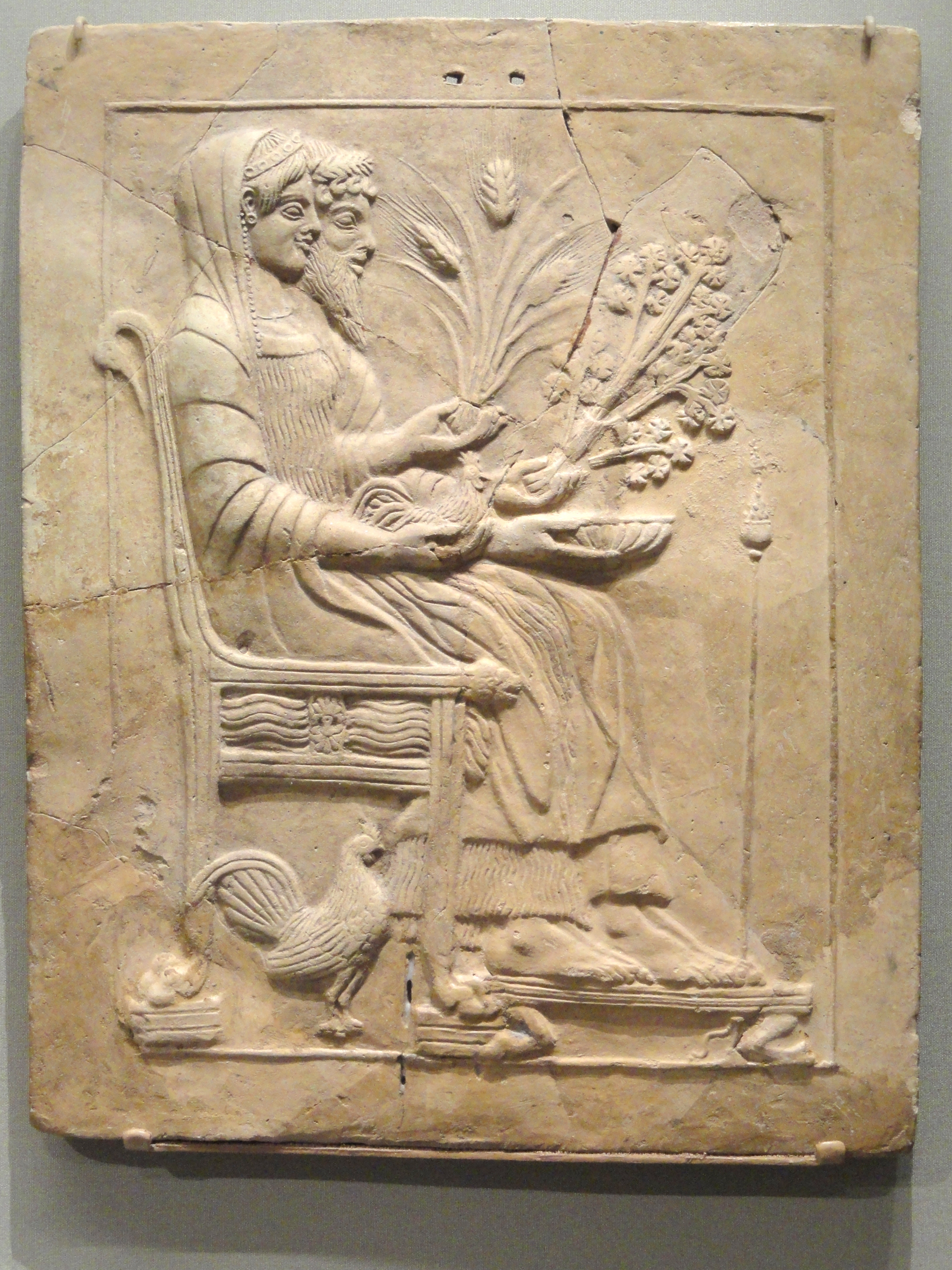
Terracotta pinax of Persephone and Hades from Locri (Museo Nazionale di Reggio Calabria)

At Locri, southern Italy, thousands of carefully buried pinakes have been recovered, most of them from the sanctuary of Persephone or that of Aphrodite. Another large group of over 1,000 pottery pinakes was found at the site of Penteskouphia, just outside Corinth. These are mostly in the Antikensammlung Berlin, with some in Corinth and the Louvre. As well as the usual religious scenes, some of these show depictions of potters at work. Berlin also has a smaller group of fragments from the Kerameikos cemetery in Athens, many by the painter Exekias.

== Etruscan art ==
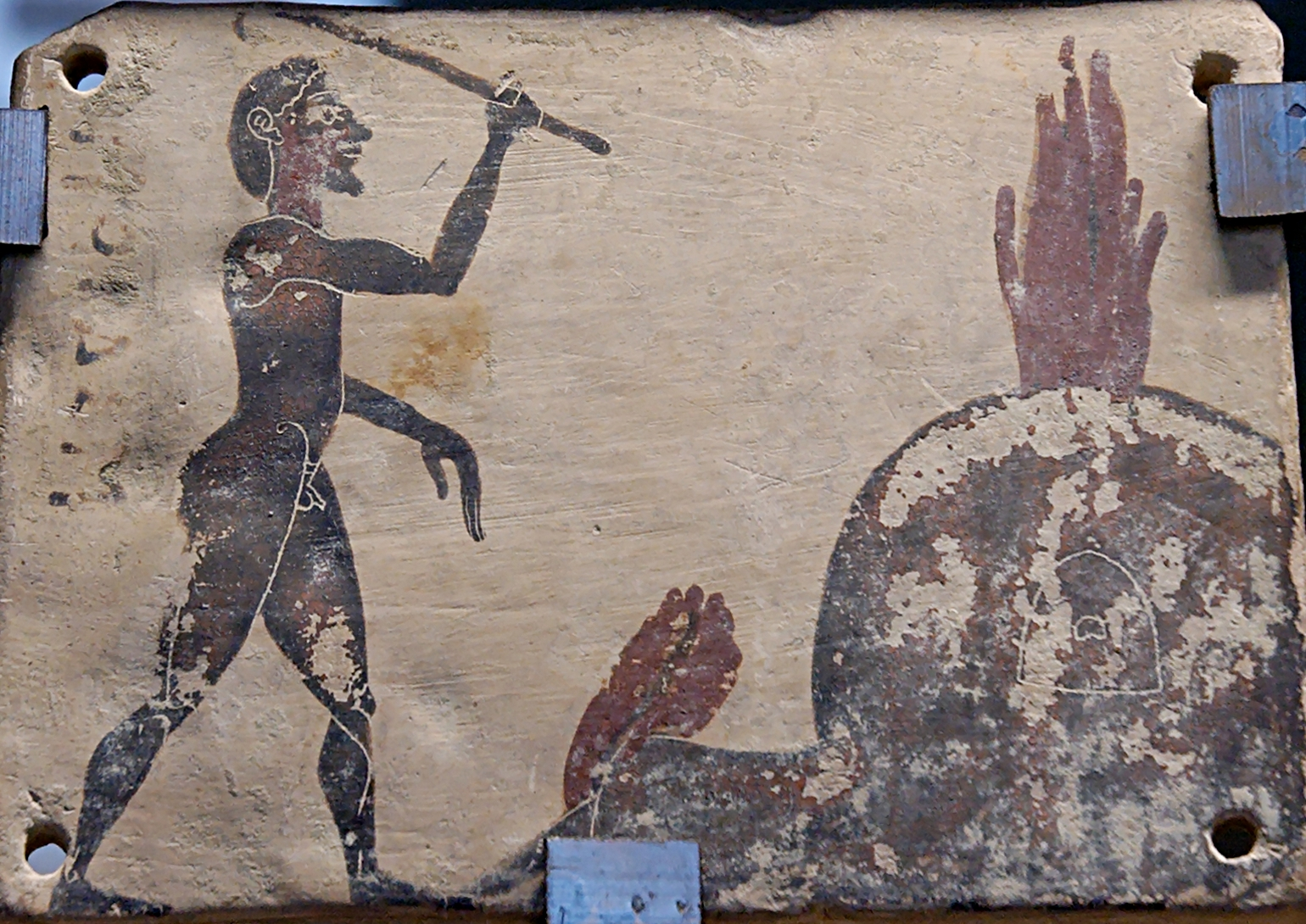
Pottery kiln, Penteskouphia

In Etruscan art, rather larger terracotta plaques than are typical in Greek art have been found in tombs, some forming a series that creates in effect a portable wall-painting. Wealthy Etruscan families often had tombs with painted walls, which the Greeks did not. The "Boccanera" tomb at the Banditaccia necropolis at Cerveteri contained five panels almost a metre high set round the wall, which are now in the British Museum. Three of them form a single scene, apparently the Judgement of Paris, while the other two flanked the inside of the entrance, with sphinxes acting as tomb guardians. They date to about 560 BC. Fragments of similar panels have been found in city centre sites, presumably from temples, elite houses and other buildings, where the subjects include scenes of everyday life.

== See also ==
- Corpus Vasorum Antiquorum
- Ex-voto
- Grave goods
- Votive site
- Ema (Shinto) – analogous votive objects in Shinto
