= GameCube online functionality =

Nintendo GameCube networking overview

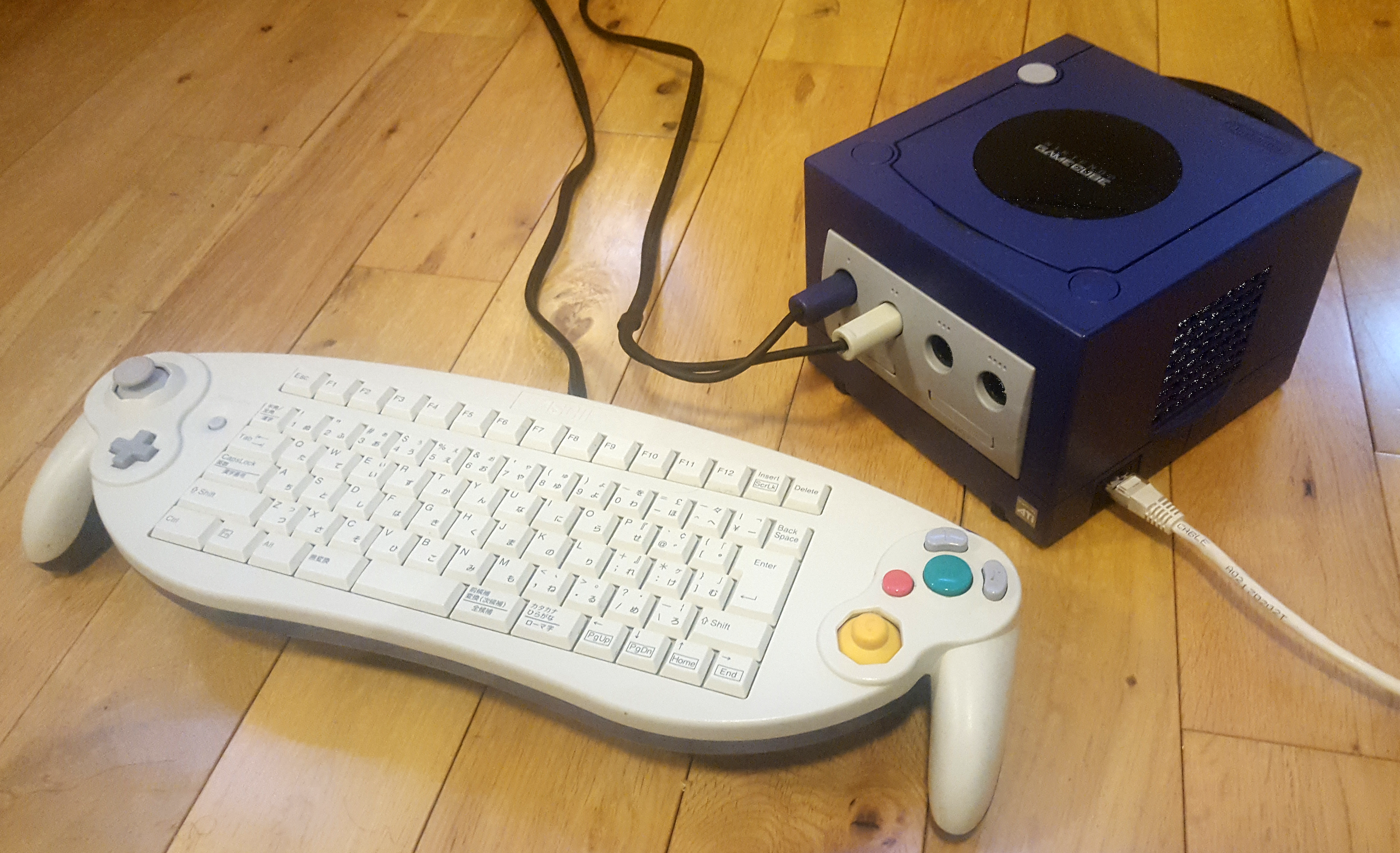
A GameCube with a broadband adapter installed and a connected ethernet cable. ASCII Corporation produced a keyboard controller to help players communicate in Phantasy Star Online.

The GameCube has limited support for online gaming. Nintendo never commissioned any servers to interface with the console, but allowed other publishers to do so. The only games released with internet-based gameplay modes were Phantasy Star Online, Phantasy Star Online Episode III: C.A.R.D. Revolution, and Homeland. Nintendo also published three racing games with local area network (LAN) support: 1080° Avalanche, Kirby Air Ride, and Mario Kart: Double Dash!!. Using network functions requires the official broadband or modem adapter since the console does not have out of the box network capabilities.

Despite competitors Microsoft and Sony advancing online gaming for their consoles, the Xbox and PlayStation 2, Nintendo remained pensive with its online strategy for the duration of the GameCube's lifespan. Company leaders including Shigeru Miyamoto and Satoru Iwata based their stance on concerns with maintaining quality control over their games and doubts that players would want to pay subscription fees.

== History ==
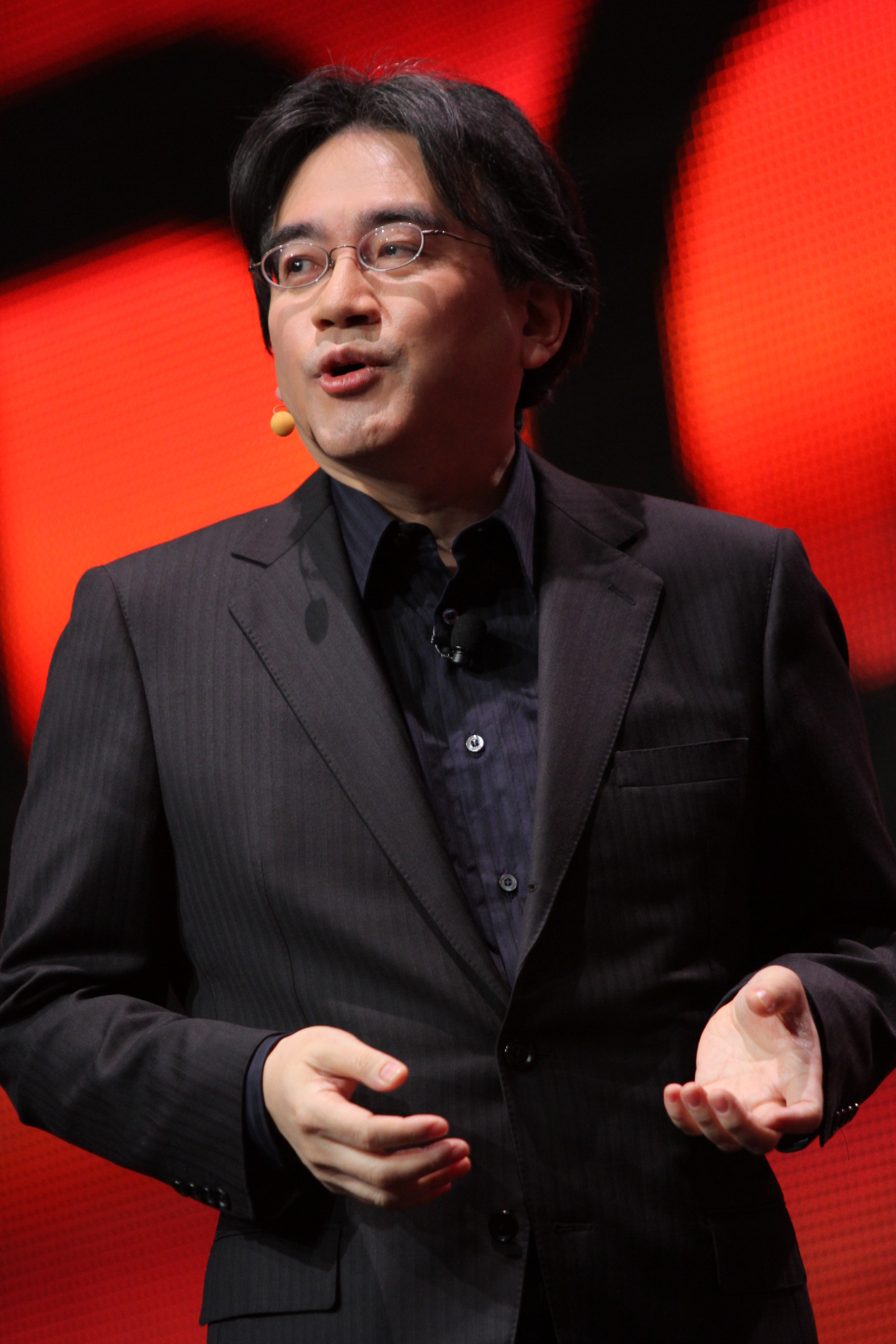
Satoru Iwata was comfortable with Nintendo's offline strategy and did not see sustainable profits in the online gaming market.

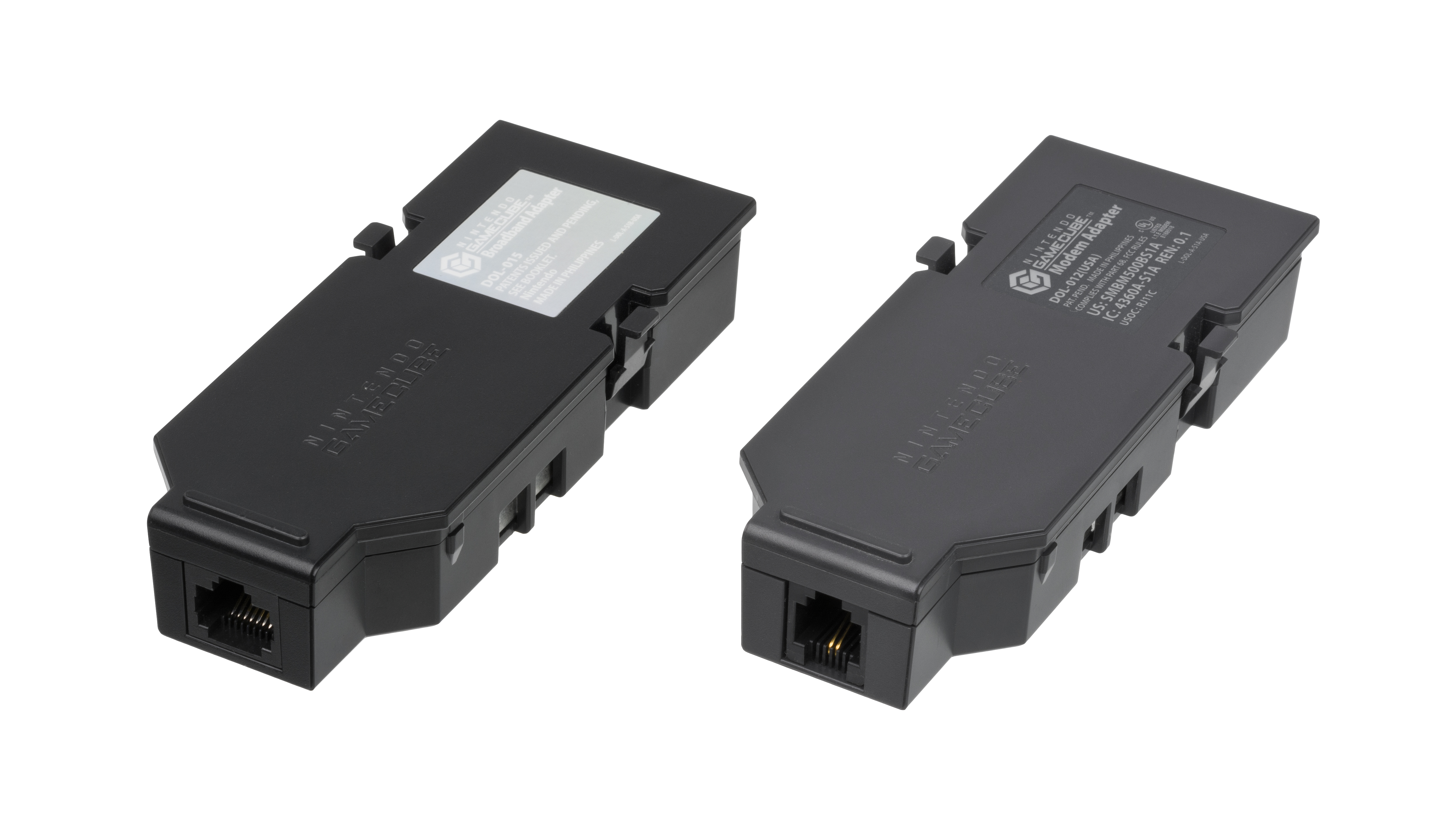
The official broadband adapter and dial-up modem accessories

Before the GameCube, Nintendo had experimented with network connectivity with three accessories released exclusively in Japan for the Famicom, Super Famicom, and Nintendo 64. For the Famicom, they developed the Family Computer Network System peripheral in 1988. The device acted as a modem and allowed players to view weather forecasts, the stock market, and bet on horse races, among other activities. Following their experiences with the device, Nintendo developed the Satellaview for the Super Famicom, a satellite modem peripheral. The modem communicated to a series of BS satellites which relayed information from servers hosted by satellite radio company St.GIGA. Using this service, players had access to exclusive games, magazines, and other downloads. Nintendo ended its partnership with St.GIGA in 1999, and partnered with Recruit to build a new online service called Randnet for the 64DD, a magnetic disk drive add-on for the Nintendo 64. Randnet gave players access to message board communities and a web browser for surfing the internet.

In 1999, an unnamed source at Nintendo of America said, "Networkability is at the top of the list for the new console." referring to the N2000 prototype which would later become the GameCube. On August 28, 1999, Nintendo EAD general manager Shigeru Miyamoto stated that the Dolphin needed some type of network communication because it was becoming an important component of entertainment. However, he said that Nintendo did not have any true motive to become significantly involved in the internet business. He stated Nintendo has a responsibility to families so that parents can always feel secure with children playing Nintendo products, and went on to say that he did not think network capabilities would be a core component of their next console.

On February 9, 2000, Miyamoto said that he was interested in online gaming, but Nintendo would only get involved with it if they developed a unique approach to the idea, not because others were doing it. At E3 2001, though demonstrating their networking accessories and Phantasy Star Online, Nintendo director and general manager Satoru Iwata stated Nintendo was confident enough with its offline strategy to not seriously explore the possibilities of online gaming. He said that Nintendo would build a network to support a worldwide audience if they could make it profitable, but he expressed doubts that online gaming would be a sustainable business model for the company, citing subscription costs as prohibitive at retaining a steady customer base. On June 8, 2000, Nintendo President Hiroshi Yamauchi said, "We are planning to introduce an internet business next March or April. The first step will be online sales of a brand new type of Pokémon cards."

Nintendo remained cautious and terse with its online strategy for the remainder of the system's lifespan while competitors Microsoft and Sony were advancing their online gaming business. Months after the system's release, Nintendo stated it was researching online projects internally, but not planning any public demonstrations. Miyamoto solidified his stance against online gaming around the same time, citing concerns that Nintendo would not be able to dictate the vision of their games nor guarantee their quality. In addition, he believed that players would not want to pay monthly fees. In a 2022 interview, Nintendo of America's former president Reggie Fils-Aimé said that Nintendo felt it excelled in local multiplayer experiences and wanted to spend time determining how to replicate those online. He added that cultural differences between Nintendo's regional branches slowed its adoption of online multiplayer, as the Japanese branch disagreed with the American and European ones over whether the infrastructure was worth investing in.

== Hardware ==
Nintendo released two networking accessories for the GameCube in October 2002 produced by Conexant, the Broadband Adapter (a network adapter) and the Modem Adapter (a 56k dial-up modem). The adapters fit flush into "Serial Port 1" on the underside of the GameCube. The Broadband Adapter is built for faster internet speeds and adds an ethernet jack to the side of the console while the Modem Adapter adds a phone jack and operates through dial-up. Both adapters can be used for the Phantasy Star Online games and Powerful Pro, but the Broadband Adapter is required for LAN-only games and Homeland. To help players communicate in Phantasy Star Online, ASCII Corporation released a stretched out controller with a full keyboard in the middle.

== Supported games ==
Title	Publisher	Regions	Internet	LAN
1080° Avalanche	Nintendo	All	No	Yes
Homeland	Chunsoft	JP	Yes	Yes
Jikkyō Powerful Pro Yakyū 10	Konami	JP	DLC	No
Kirby Air Ride	Nintendo	All	No	Yes
Mario Kart: Double Dash!!	Nintendo	All	No	Yes
Phantasy Star Online Episode I & II	Sega	All	Yes	No
Phantasy Star Online Episode I & II Plus	Sega	JP / NA	Yes	No
Phantasy Star Online Episode III: C.A.R.D. Revolution	Sega	All	Yes	No

Nintendo did not develop any servers or internet service to interface with GameCube consoles, and instead made publishers responsible for providing server interfaces and managing the online experience for their games.

=== Internet games ===
The first GameCube game with internet access was Phantasy Star Online Episode I & II, a role-playing game (RPG) developed by Sonic Team and published by Sega. Originally released for the Dreamcast in 2000, it was ported to the GameCube in 2002 with additional content. The servers were maintained by Sega, and players were charged US$8.95 per month to play online. Sega released an enhanced version in 2003, subtitled Plus, which added quests to the offline mode, originally exclusive to the online mode. Sega released a sequel in 2003 which also featured online modes, Phantasy Star Online Episode III: C.A.R.D. Revolution. The game features turn-based RPG battles that could be played competitively online. The Phantasy Star Online servers were officially discontinued on March 31, 2007, but all three games can still be played online via fan maintained private servers.

Japan received an exclusive online RPG in 2005 by Chunsoft titled Homeland. Chunsoft did not charge a subscription fee and elected to allow players to host games on their own system, although they maintained central servers to match players with one another. The host player was the "God player" and could transform the world and lead the other players, or "questers", on their adventure. The matching service ended April 30, 2007. Up to 35 players could join one game, and LAN connectivity was also supported.

Japan also received Jikkyō Powerful Pro Yakyū 10, a baseball game that could access free downloadable content, but offered no online gaming modes.

=== LAN games ===
Nintendo published three racing games with LAN multiplayer modes: 1080° Avalanche, Kirby Air Ride, and Mario Kart: Double Dash!!. When playing over a LAN, multiple systems can be connected through a shared ethernet hub or two systems can be connected directly to one another with a cross cable. 1080° Avalanche and Kirby Air Ride support up to four players across four consoles. If two consoles are used, up to two players can play on each system. If three or four consoles are used, only one player may play per system. For Mario Kart, up to 16 players can play simultaneously across eight consoles, with two players controlling each kart. When two consoles are used, up to four players can play per console, with each player controlling their own kart. If more than two consoles are used, only two players can play on each system cooperatively as two characters sharing one kart. Although the games do not support internet gameplay natively, hobbyists developed third-party PC applications that tunnel the GameCube's network traffic across the internet, such as Warp Pipe and XLink Kai.

=== Abandoned projects ===
Some developers planned networking modes for their GameCube games but these were never realized. Hironobu Sakaguchi commented in July 2001 that they were planning on taking their Final Fantasy series online and it would need to be on all platforms to be profitable, including the GameCube. In May 2001, Namco mentioned they were working on six online titles for all three sixth generation consoles, including the GameCube. The GameCube version of Tom Clancy's Splinter Cell: Pandora Tomorrow had a planned online mode. The first Battlefield game, Battlefield 1942, was proposed by DICE as a GameCube exclusive to Nintendo. Though satisfied with the proposal, negotiations never made it further because Nintendo had no online strategy. LAN modes were planned for Mario Power Tennis and F-Zero GX, but these were later abandoned.

== See also ==
- Nintendo Wi-Fi Connection and WiiConnect24, Nintendo's free online services for the Wii and DS
- Nintendo Network, Nintendo's free online service for the Wii U and 3DS
- Nintendo Switch Online, Nintendo's paid online service for the Switch
- Dreamcast online functionality
- PlayStation 2 online functionality
- Xbox Live
