= GameCube =

Video game console by Nintendo

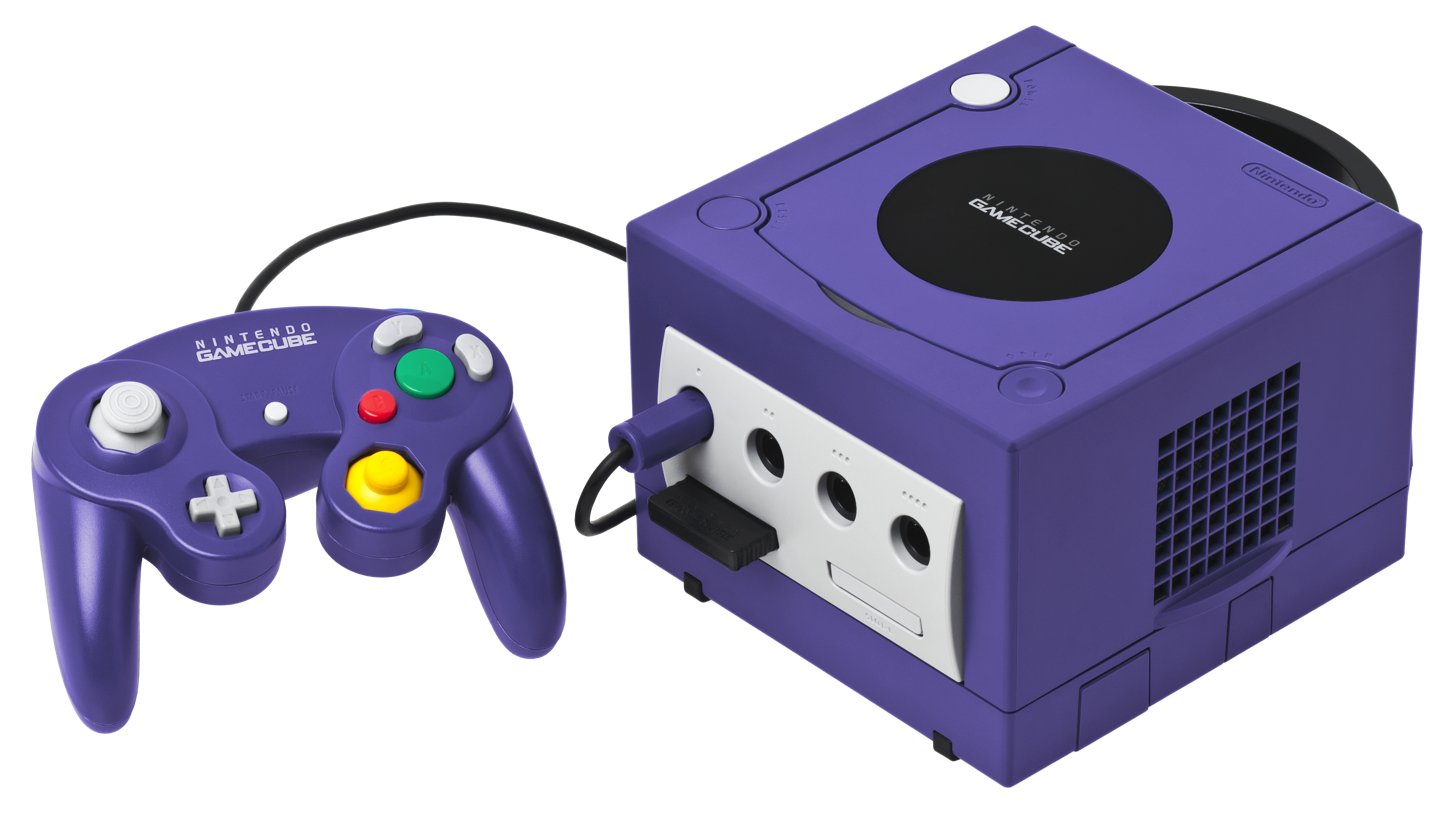
- GameCube in "Indigo" with matching controller and memory card inserted
- Codename: Dolphin
- Developer: Nintendo
- Manufacturer: Nintendo; Foxconn
- Type: Home video game console
- Generation: Sixth
- Released: September 14, 2001: JP: September 14, 2001; NA: November 18, 2001; EU: May 3, 2002; AU: May 17, 2002
- Introductory price: ¥25,000 (equivalent to ¥28,100 in 2024); US$199 (equivalent to $360 in 2025); €199 (equivalent to €310 in 2023)
- Discontinued: February 2007
- Units sold: WW: 21.74 million (details); NA: 12.94 million; JP: 4.04 million
- Media: GameCube Game Disc; Game Pak (Game Boy Player required)
- Operating system: Proprietary
- CPU: IBM Gekko @ 486 MHz
- Memory: 24 MB 1T-SRAM as system RAM; 3 MB 1T-SRAM as video RAM; 16 MB DRAM as I/O buffer RAM
- Removable storage: GameCube Memory Card (Note: 16 MB max. capacity)
- Display: 480i, 480p
- Graphics: ATI Flipper @ 162 MHz
- Sound: * Analog stereo; * I²S digital stereo (early models) (Note: NTSC consoles only, requires third-party cable/adapter and the use of the Digital AV port, which was removed from later models after DOL-001); * Dolby Pro Logic II with MusyX
- Controller input: GameCube controller, WaveBird, GBA, various
- Connectivity: List: Audio/video output; AV Multi port; Composite; S-Video (Note: NTSC consoles only); SCART (Note: PAL consoles only); Component (early models) (Note: NTSC consoles only, requires the use of the Digital AV port, which was removed from later models after DOL-001); D-terminal (early models) (Note: NTSC consoles only, requires the use of the Digital AV port, which was removed from later models after DOL-001); Optical audio (early models) (Note: NTSC consoles only, requires third-party cable/adapter and the use of the Digital AV port, which was removed from later models after DOL-001) Other; Ethernet and dialup (requires broadband or modem adapter)
- Power: 46-watt AC adapter (DOL-001); 48-watt AC adapter (DOL-101)
- Online services: LAN; Phantasy Star Online; Homeland; GameCube online functionality
- Dimensions: 150 × 161 × 110 mm (5.9 × 6.3 × 4.3 in)
- Weight: 1.4 kg (3.1 lb)
- Best-selling game: Super Smash Bros. Melee (7.09 million) (Note: As of March 10, 2008) (list)
- Backward compatibility: Select Game Boy, Game Boy Color, and Game Boy Advance games via Game Boy Player
- Predecessor: Nintendo 64
- Successor: Wii

The GameCube, (Note: Japanese: ゲームキューブ, Hepburn: Gēmukyūbu) (Note: Abbreviated as both NGC and GC in Japan, and as GCN in North America and Europe) officially known as the Nintendo GameCube, is a home video game console developed and marketed by Nintendo. It was released in Japan on September 14, 2001, in North America on November 18, 2001, and in Europe on May 3, 2002. It was Nintendo's fourth major home console, succeeding the Nintendo 64, and competed with Sony's PlayStation 2 and Microsoft's Xbox in the sixth generation of game consoles.

Nintendo began developing the GameCube in 1998 after entering a partnership with ArtX to design a graphics processing unit. It was the first Nintendo console to use optical discs instead of ROM cartridges, supplemented by writable memory cards for saved games. Unlike its competitors, the GameCube was solely focused on games; games were distributed on a MiniDVD-based format, and most models cannot play DVDs or CDs. The GameCube controller uses a handlebar design with a staggered analog stick layout. GameCube accessories include a link cable that enables connectivity with the Game Boy Advance (GBA) and e-Reader, the Game Boy Player add-on for running Game Boy, Game Boy Color, and GBA games, and the WaveBird Wireless Controller. Select games supported online gaming via a broadband or modem adapter.

The GameCube received praise for its controller and exclusive games, but criticism for its toy-like design and lack of multimedia features. Though profitable, it sold far less than the PlayStation 2 and slightly less than the Xbox, only outselling Sega's Dreamcast. Nintendo sold 21.74 million consoles worldwide, (Note: Sales figures differ, as some sources show the GameCube sold 24 million units worldwide.) much fewer than anticipated. This has been attributed to a weak launch game lineup and Nintendo's focus on younger players, a minority of the gaming audience at the time, rather than teenagers and adults. Compared to its competitors, the GameCube's third-party support was limited; some developers skipped releasing multiplatform games on the GameCube, and others reduced support due to poor sales.

Nintendo released a successor, the Wii, on November 19, 2006; most Wiis are backward compatible with GameCube games and accessories. It discontinued the GameCube in February 2007. In retrospect, video game journalists have ranked the GameCube among the best game consoles. The GameCube's library includes acclaimed games such as Super Smash Bros. Melee (2001), Super Mario Sunshine (2002), Eternal Darkness (2002), Metroid Prime (2002), The Legend of Zelda: The Wind Waker (2002), Paper Mario: The Thousand-Year Door (2004), and Resident Evil 4 (2005). Several popular Nintendo franchises, including Animal Crossing, Luigi's Mansion, and Pikmin, began on the GameCube. The GameCube controller has been supported on every subsequent Nintendo home console.

== History ==
=== Development ===
In 1997, the graphics hardware design company ArtX was founded, with twenty engineers who had previously worked at SGI. ArtX was led by Wei Yen, who had been SGI's head of Nintendo Operations and of Project Reality, which from 1993 to 1996 had scaled down SGI's supercomputer design to create the Nintendo 64 console.

In May 1998, ArtX entered into a partnership with Nintendo to undertake the complete design of the system logic and graphics processor, codenamed "Flipper", for Nintendo's sixth-generation video game console. The console went through a series of codenames, including N2000, Star Cube, and Nintendo Advance. On May 12, 1999, Nintendo announced the console during a press conference, giving it the codename "Dolphin" and positioning it as the successor to the Nintendo 64. They also announced partnerships with IBM to create Dolphin's PowerPC-based CPU, codenamed "Gekko," and with Panasonic (Matsushita Electric Industrial Co., Ltd.) for the development of its DVD drive and other Dolphin-based devices. Following this announcement, Nintendo began providing development kits to game developers, including Rare and Retro Studios.

In April 2000, ArtX was acquired by ATI, but the Flipper graphics processor design had already been mostly completed by ArtX and was not overtly influenced by ATI. ArtX co-founder Greg Buchner recalled that their portion of the console's hardware design timeline had arced from inception in 1998 to completion in 2000. Of the ArtX acquisition, an ATI spokesperson said, "ATI now becomes a major supplier to the game console market via Nintendo. The Dolphin platform is reputed to be king of the hill in terms of graphics and video performance with 128-bit architecture."

The console was announced as the GameCube at a press conference in Japan on August 25, 2000, abbreviated as both "NGC" and "GC" in Japan and "GCN" in Europe and North America. Nintendo unveiled its software lineup at E3 2001, focusing on fifteen launch games, including Luigi's Mansion and Star Wars Rogue Squadron II: Rogue Leader. Several games originally scheduled to launch with the console were delayed. The GameCube was the first Nintendo home console since the Famicom to not have a Mario game as a launch title.

Long before the launch, Nintendo developed and patented an early prototype of motion controls for the GameCube, with which the developer Factor 5 had experimented for its launch games. Greg Thomas, Sega of America's VP of Development said "What does worry me is Dolphin's sensory controllers [which are rumored to include microphones and headphone jacks] because there's an example of someone thinking about something different." These motion control concepts would not be deployed to consumers for several years, until the Wii Remote.

Prior to the GameCube's release, Nintendo focused resources on the launch of the Game Boy Advance (GBA), a handheld game console and successor to the original Game Boy and Game Boy Color. Several games planned for the Nintendo 64 were postponed to become early releases on the GameCube. Concurrently, Nintendo was developing GameCube software provisioning future connectivity with the GBA. Certain games, such as The Legend of Zelda: Four Swords Adventures and Final Fantasy Crystal Chronicles, can use the GBA as a secondary screen and controller when connected to the GameCube via a link cable.

Nintendo began its marketing campaign with the catchphrase "The Nintendo Difference" at its E3 2001 reveal. The goal was to distinguish itself from the competition as an entertainment company. Later advertisements had the slogan "Born to Play", and game ads feature a rotating cube animation that morphs into a GameCube logo and end with a voice whispering "GameCube". On May 21, 2001, the launch price of US$199 was announced, $100 lower than that of the PlayStation 2 and Xbox. Nintendo spent $76 million on marketing.

In September 2020, leaked documents included Nintendo's plans for a GameCube model that would be both portable with a built-in display and dockable to a TV, similar to its later console, the Nintendo Switch. Other leaks suggest plans for a GameCube successor codenamed Tako, with HD graphics and slots for SD and memory cards, apparently resulting from a partnership with ATI and scheduled for release in 2005. Tako was abandoned for Revolution (later revealed and released as the Wii in 2006), a non-HD console with motion controls. Nintendo would later work on Project Cafe, an HD console that became the Wii U, released in 2012.

=== Release ===
The GameCube was launched in Japan on September 14, 2001. Approximately 500,000 units were shipped in time to retailers. The console was scheduled to launch two months later in North America on November 5, 2001, but this was delayed in an effort to increase the number of available units. The console eventually launched in North America on November 18, with over 700,000 units shipped. Other regions followed the following year, beginning with Europe in the second quarter of 2002.

On April 22, 2002, the third-party Nintendo console developer Factor 5 announced its 3D audio software development kit, MusyX. In collaboration with Dolby Laboratories, MusyX provided motion-based surround sound encoded as Dolby Pro Logic II.

=== Market share ===
Throughout the mid-2000s, GameCube hardware sales remained far behind the PlayStation 2 and slightly behind the Xbox, though there were brief periods when it would outsell both. The family-friendly appeal and lack of support from certain third-party developers skewed toward a younger market, a minority of the gaming population at the time. Many third-party games popular with teenagers or adults, such as the blockbuster Grand Theft Auto series and several key first-person shooters, did not release on the GameCube, instead releasing on the PlayStation 2 and Xbox. However, many journalists and analysts noted that Nintendo's focus on younger audiences and its family-friendly image were both an advantage and a disadvantage at a time when video games were often aimed at more mature audiences. (Note: Attributed to multiple references:) Nintendo was successful with games aimed at a more mature audience.

In June 2003, the GameCube had a 13% market share, tying with the Xbox in sales, but still far below the 60% of the PlayStation 2. However, despite slow sales and tough competition, Nintendo's position had improved in 2004. The American market share for the GameCube had increased from 19% to 37% in one year due to price cuts and high-quality games. (Note: Attributed to multiple references:) One article stated that by early 2004, the GameCube had a 39% market share in America. By Christmas of 2003, Nintendo of America's president, George Harrison, reported that price cuts down to just under $100 had quadrupled sales in the American market. The GameCube's profitability never reached that of the PlayStation 2 or GBA. However, it was eventually more profitable than the Xbox.

In Europe, the GameCube's first two years had similarly slow sales, but by 2004, it had a hardware market share of 32%. Due to price drops, which helped sales in the American market, and well reviewed games such as Pokémon Colosseum and Resident Evil 4, the GameCube improved to outsell the Xbox in Europe. The top three European countries that contributed to the success of the GameCube were the UK, France, and Germany. The GameCube also sold well in Spain and Italy. (Note: Attributed to multiple references:) Though falling behind the PlayStation 2, the GameCube was overall successful and profitable in Europe.

=== Discontinuation ===
Nintendo launched the Wii, the successor to the GameCube, on November 19, 2006, in North America and in December 2006 in other regions. In February 2007, Nintendo announced that it had ended first-party support for the GameCube and that it had been discontinued, as it was shifting its manufacturing and development efforts towards the Wii and its new handheld console, the Nintendo DS. GameCube controllers, game discs, and certain accessories continued to be supported via the Wii's backward compatibility, although these features were removed in later iterations of the Wii console. The final game officially released on the GameCube was Madden NFL 08, on August 14, 2007. Several games originally developed for the GameCube were reworked for a Wii release, such as Super Paper Mario, or released on both consoles, such as the Wii launch game The Legend of Zelda: Twilight Princess.

== Hardware ==
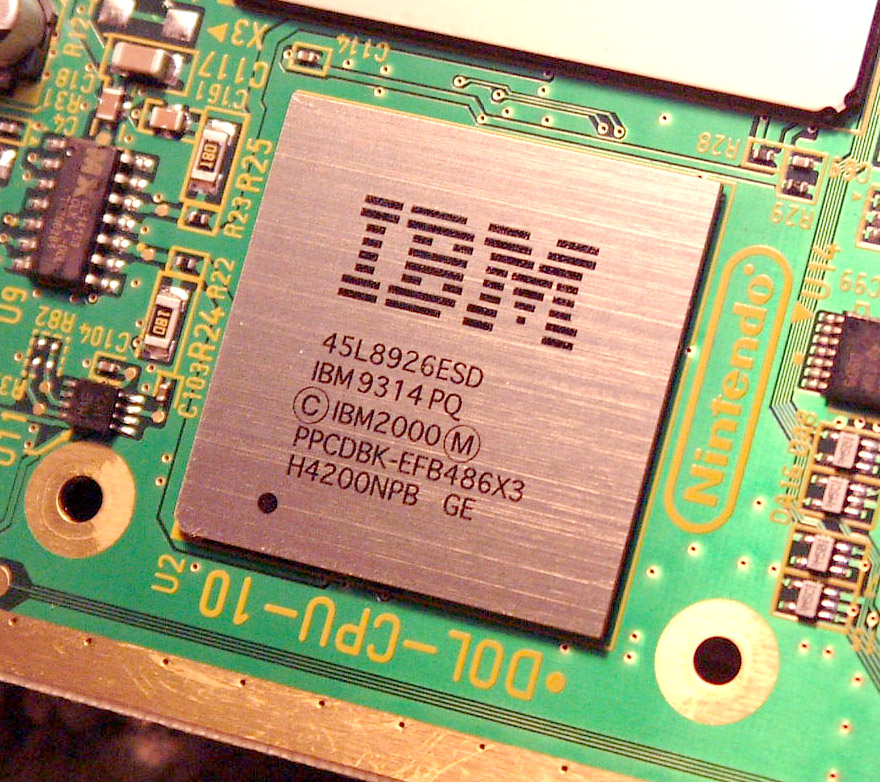
Gekko CPU

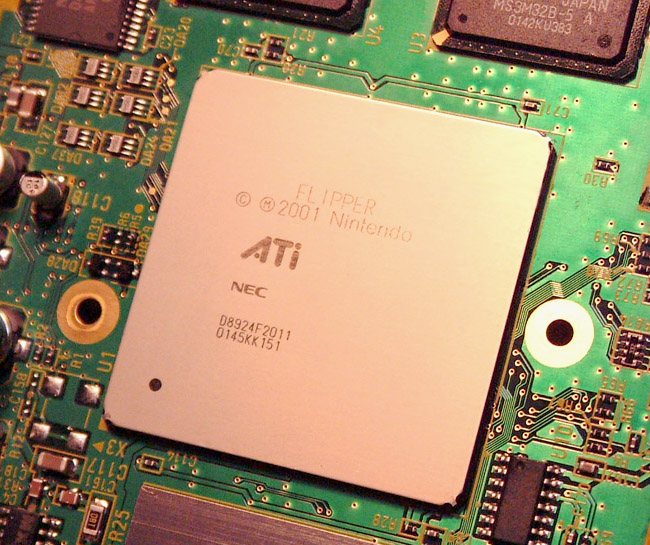
Flipper GPU

Howard Cheng, technical director of Nintendo technology development, said the company's goal was to select a "simple RISC architecture" to help speed up the development of games by making it easier on software developers. IGN reported that the system was "designed from the get-go to attract third-party developers by offering more power at a cheaper price. Nintendo's design document for the console specifies that cost is of utmost importance, followed by space." Hardware partner ArtX's Vice President Greg Buchner stated that their guiding thought on the console's hardware design was to target the developers rather than the players, and to "look into a crystal ball" and discern "what's going to allow the Miyamoto-sans of the world to develop the best games".

We thought about the developers as our main customers. In particular, for GameCube, we spent three years working with Nintendo of America and with all sorts of developers, trying to understand the challenges, needs, and problems they face. First among these is the rising cost of development. The GameCube can see high performance without too much trouble; it isn't a quirky design, but a very clean one. It was important we didn't require jumping through hoops for high performance to be achieved. On top of that, it is rich in features, and we worked to include a dream group of technical features that developers requested.

— Greg Buchner, ArtX's Vice President

Initiating the GameCube's design in 1998, Nintendo partnered with ArtX (then acquired by ATI Technologies during development) for the system logic and the GPU, and with IBM for the CPU. IBM designed a 32-bit PowerPC-based processor with custom architectural extensions for the next-generation console, known as Gekko, which runs at 486 MHz and features a floating point unit (FPU) capable of a total throughput of 1.9 GFLOPS and a peak of 10.5 GFLOPS. Described as "an extension of the IBM PowerPC architecture", the Gekko CPU is based on the PowerPC 750CXe with IBM's 0.18 μm CMOS technology, which features copper interconnects. Codenamed Flipper, the GPU runs at 162 MHz, and in addition to graphics manages other tasks through its audio and input/output (I/O) processors.

The GameCube is Nintendo's first console to not use primarily cartridge media, following the Famicom Data Recorder, Famicom Disk System, SNES-CD, and 64DD which represent past explorations of complementary storage technologies. The GameCube introduced a proprietary miniDVD optical disc format for up to 1.5 GB of data. It was designed by Matsushita Electric Industrial (now Panasonic Corporation) with a proprietary copy-protection scheme unlike the Content Scramble System (CSS) in standard DVDs. The size is sufficient for most games, although a few multi-platform games require an extra disc, higher video compression, or removal of content. By comparison, the PlayStation 2 and Xbox use CDs and DVDs up to 8.5 GB.

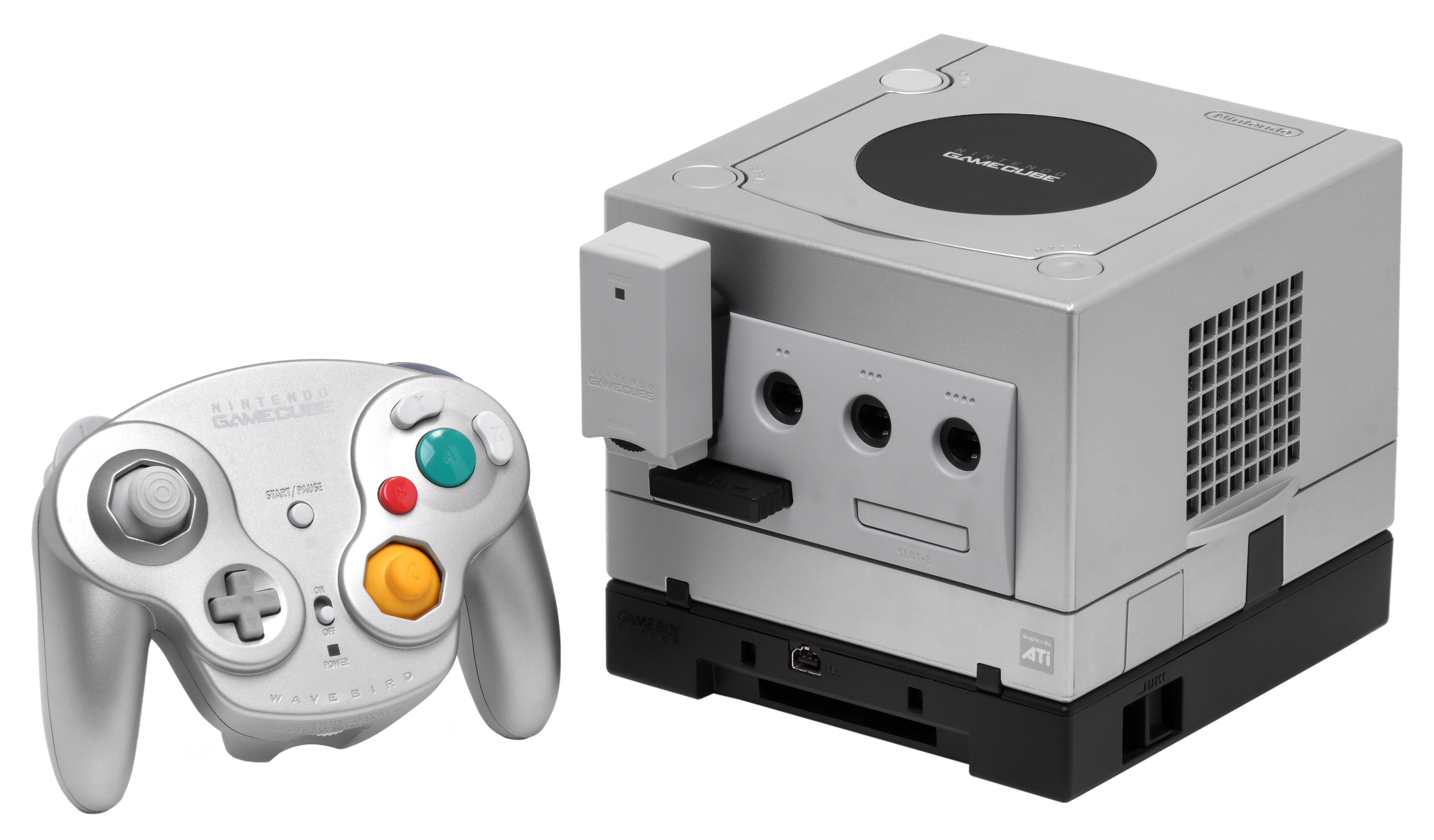
A Platinum GameCube with a WaveBird Wireless Controller and Game Boy Player attached

Like its predecessor, the Nintendo 64, GameCube models were produced in several different color motifs. The system launched in "Indigo", the primary color shown in advertising and on the logo, and in "Jet Black". One year later, Nintendo released a "Platinum" GameCube, which uses a silver color scheme for both the console and controller. A "Spice" orange-colored console was eventually released only in Japan, though that scheme is only on controllers released in other countries. A Platinum Pokémon XD: Gale of Darkness console was released in 2005 only in North America with a custom faceplate and a standard Platinum controller.

Nintendo developed stereoscopic 3D technology for the GameCube, supported by one launch game, Luigi's Mansion. However, the feature never reached production. 3D televisions were not widespread, and it was deemed that compatible displays and crystals for the add-on accessories would be too cost-prohibitive for the consumer. Two audio Easter eggs can be invoked when the power is activated with the "Z" button on the Player 1 controller held down, or with four controllers connected and holding down the "Z" buttons.

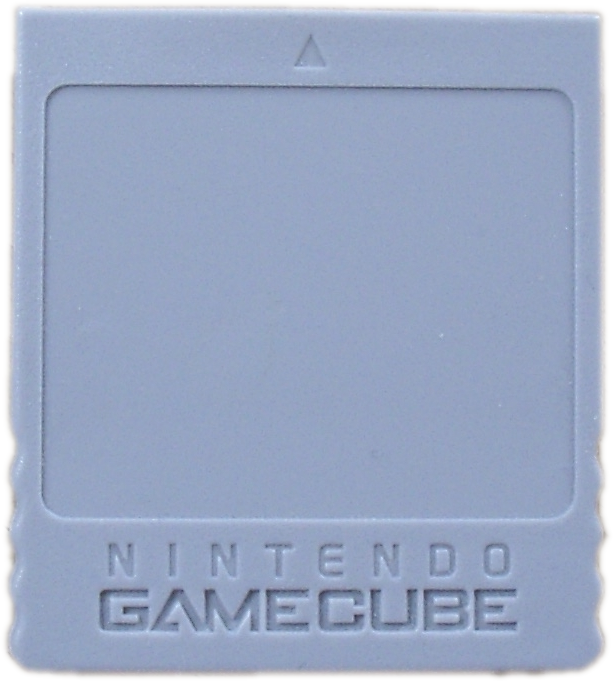
Memory Card 59

The GameCube features two memory card ports for saving game data. Nintendo released three memory card options: Memory Card 59 in gray (512 KB), Memory Card 251 in black (2 MB), and Memory Card 1019 in white (8 MB). These are often advertised in megabits instead: 4 Mb, 16 Mb, and 64 Mb, respectively. Memory cards with larger capacities were released by third-party manufacturers.

=== Controller ===
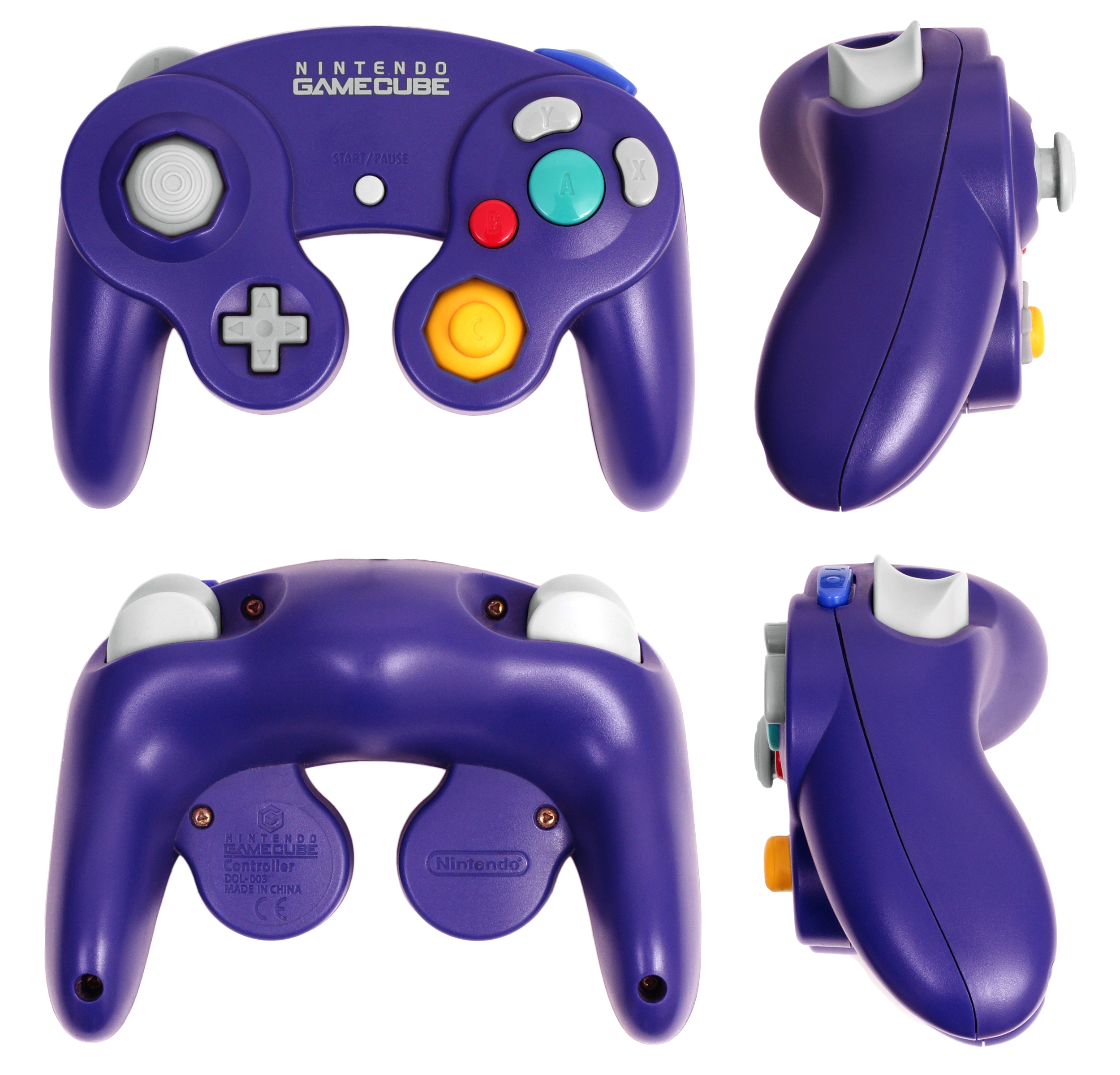
Indigo GameCube controller

Nintendo learned from its experiences—both positive and negative—with the Nintendo 64's three-handled controller design and chose a two-handled, "handlebar" design for the GameCube. The shape was popularized by Sony's PlayStation controller released in 1994 and its follow-up DualShock series in 1997 with vibration feedback and two analog sticks to improve the 3D experience. Nintendo and Microsoft designed similar features in the controllers for their sixth-generation consoles, but instead of having the analog sticks in parallel, they are staggered by swapping the positions of the directional pad (d-pad) and left analog stick. The GameCube controller features a total of eight buttons, two analog sticks, a d-pad, and a rumble motor. The primary analog stick is on the left with the d-pad located below and closer to the center. On the right are four buttons: a large, green "A" button in the center, a smaller red "B" button to the left, an "X" button to the right, and a "Y" button at the top. Below and to the inside is a yellow "C" analog stick, which often serves a variety of in-game functions, such as controlling the camera angle. The Start/Pause button is located in the middle, and the rumble motor is encased within the center of the controller.

On the top are two "pressure-sensitive" trigger buttons marked "L" and "R". Each trigger functions as both an analog and a digital input. As the trigger is depressed, it emits an increasing analog signal. Once fully depressed, the trigger "clicks" with a digital signal that a game can use for a separate function. There is also a purple, digital button on the right side marked "Z".

The A button has a uniquely prominent size and placement, having been the primary action button in past Nintendo controller designs. The rubberized analog stick, within the overall button orientation, similarly addresses "Nintendo thumb" pain.

In 2002, Nintendo introduced the WaveBird Wireless Controller, the first Wireless gamepad developed by a first-party console manufacturer. The RF-based wireless controller is similar in design to the standard controller. It communicates with the GameCube with a wireless receiver dongle. Powered by two AA batteries, it lacks vibration.

=== Compatibility ===
The GameCube uses GameCube Game Discs, and also supports Game Pak cartridges for the Game Boy, Game Boy Color, and Game Boy Advance through the official Game Boy Player accessory. The original version of the GameCube's successor, the Wii, is backward-compatible with GameCube controllers, memory cards, and games, but not the Game Boy Player or other hardware attachments that use the Expansion Slot, which is not featured on the Wii. Later revisions of the Wii, including the "Family Edition" released in 2011 and the Wii Mini released in 2012, do not support any GameCube hardware or software.

=== Panasonic Q ===
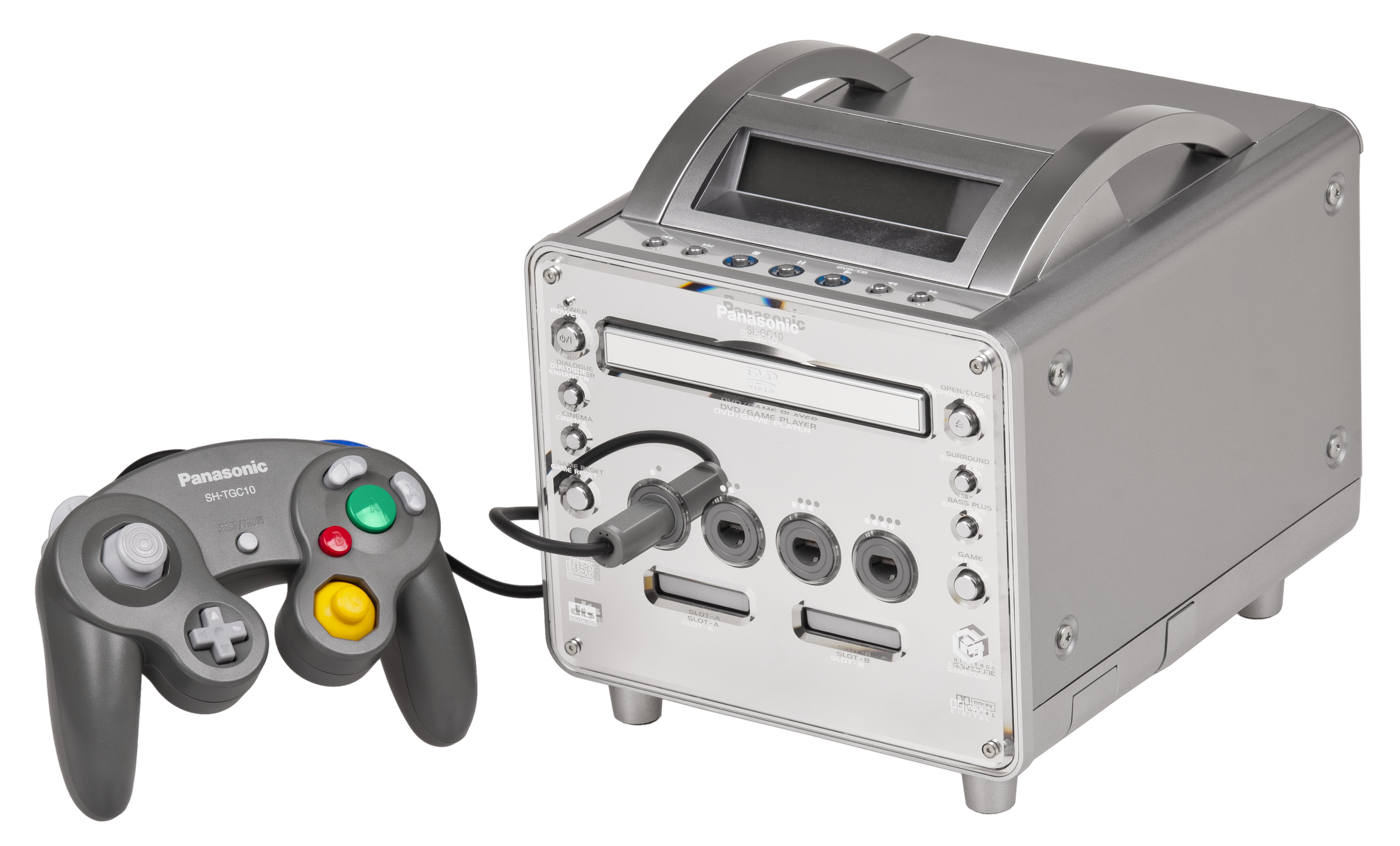
The Panasonic Q contains a DVD movie player.

The Panasonic Q (Note: Japanese: パナソニックQ, Hepburn: Panasonikku Kyū) is a hybrid version of the GameCube with a standard DVD player, developed by Panasonic in a strategic alliance with Nintendo to develop the optical drive for the original GameCube hardware. Its stainless steel case is completely revised with a DVD-sized front-loading tray, a backlit LCD screen with playback controls, and a carrying handle like the GameCube. Announced by Panasonic on October 19, 2001, it was released exclusively in Japan on December 14 at a suggested retail price of ¥39,800; however, low sales resulted in Panasonic announcing the discontinuation of the Q on December 18, 2003. The Q supports CDs, DVDs, and GameCube discs but there is virtually no integration between the GameCube and DVD player modes.

=== Technical specifications ===
Nintendo originally offered a digital video output on early GameCube models. However, it was determined that less than one percent of users utilized the feature. The company eventually removed the option starting with model number DOL-101 of May 2004. The console's technical specifications are as follows.

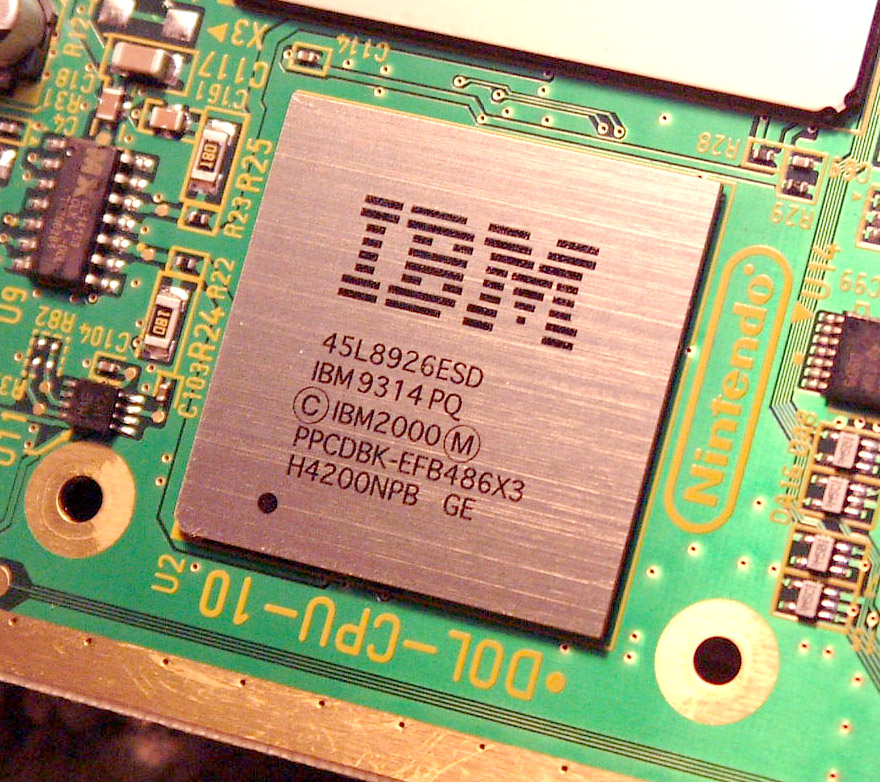
IBM PowerPC "Gekko" processor

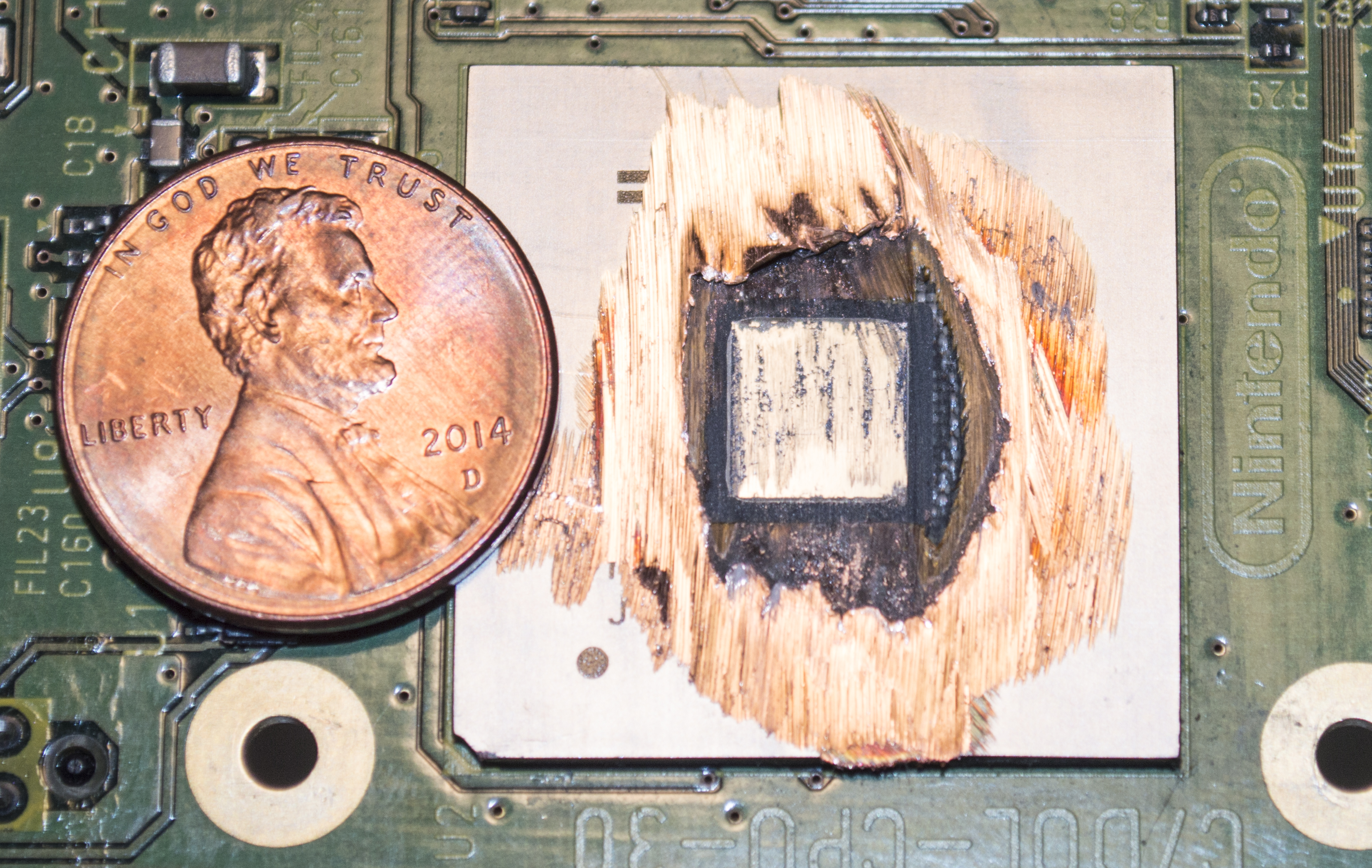
IBM PowerPC "Gekko" processor (180 nm) shaved down to show the silicon die

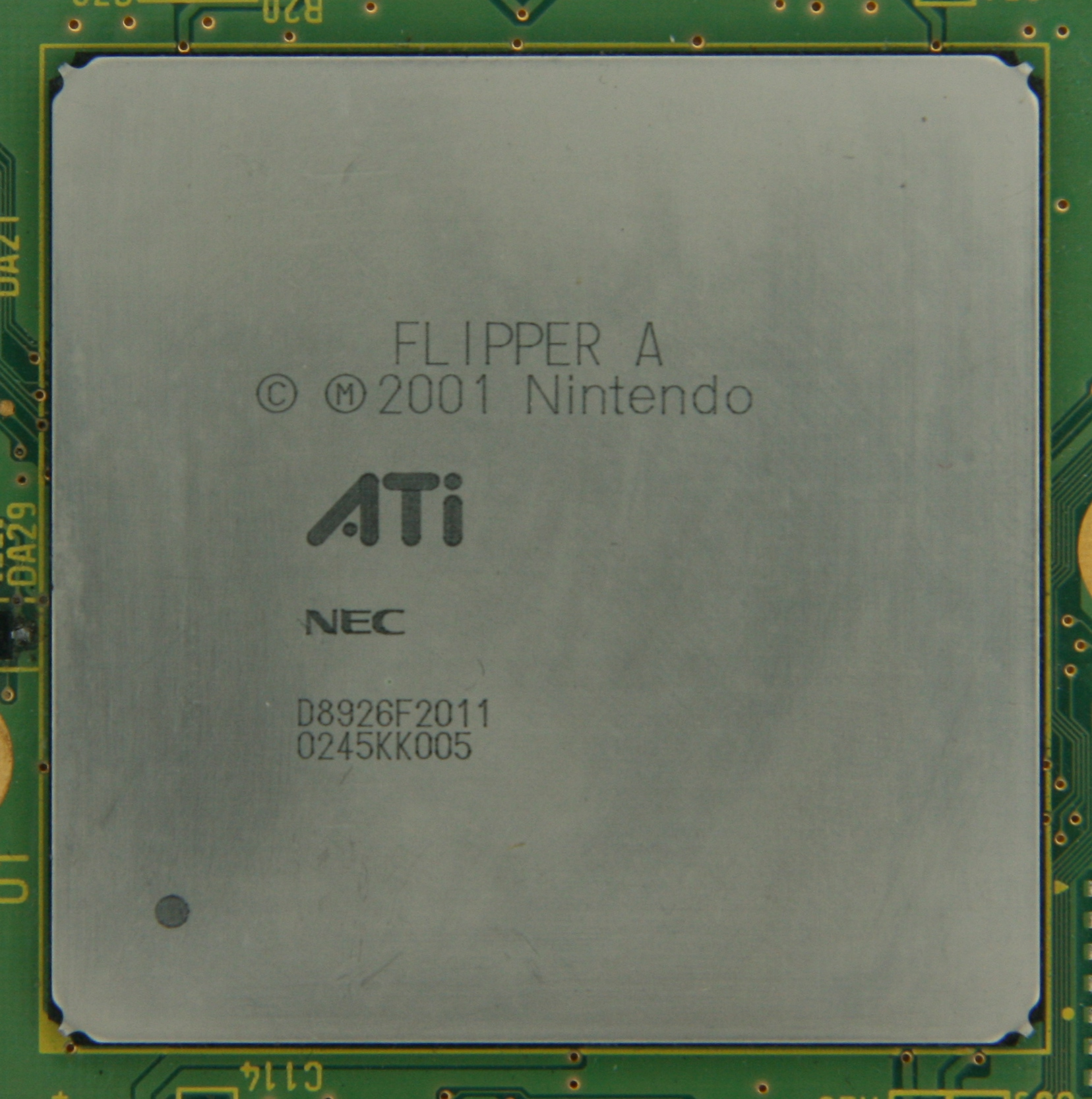
ATi "Flipper" processor

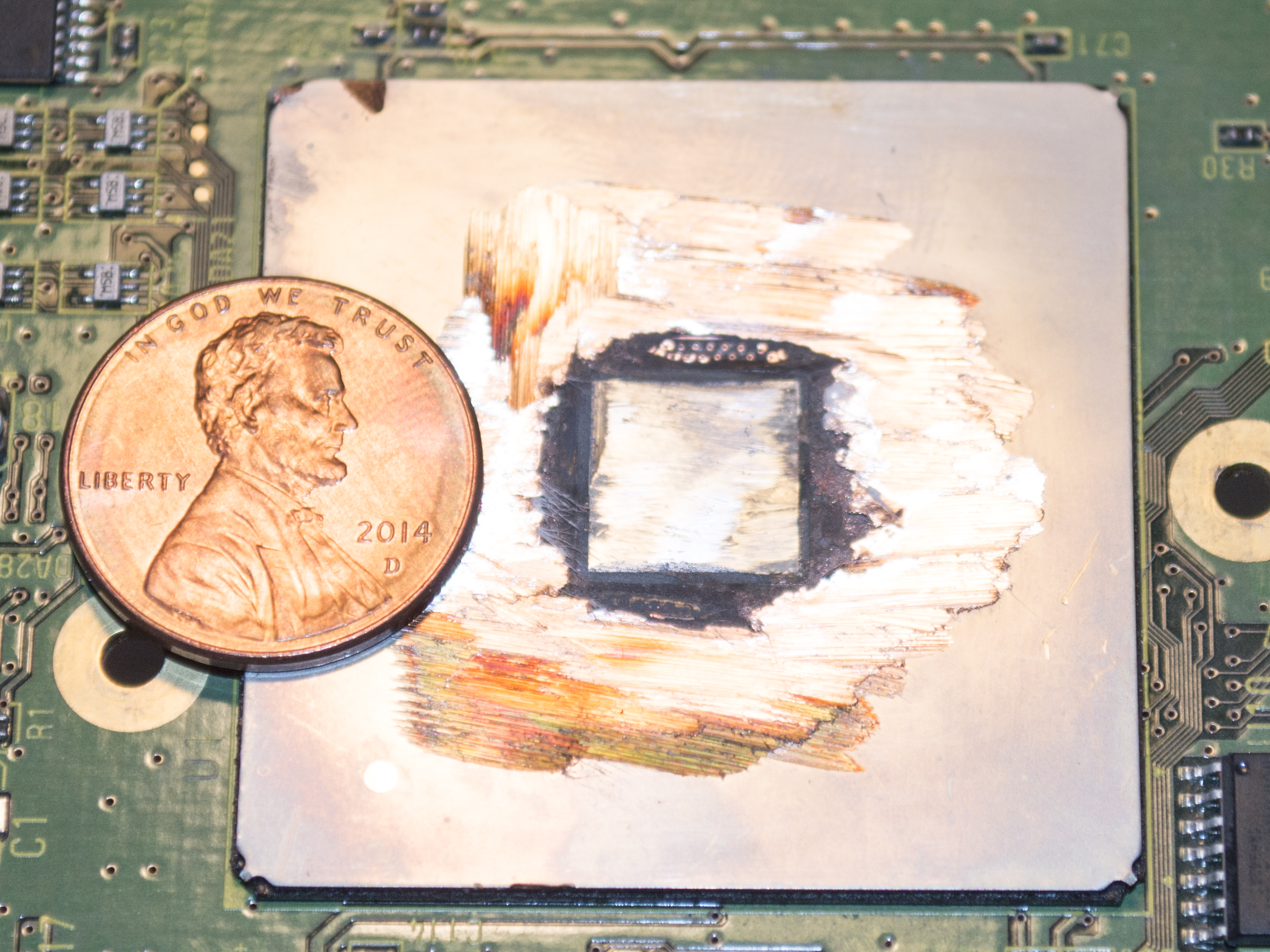
ATi "Flipper" (180 nm) shaved down to show the silicon die

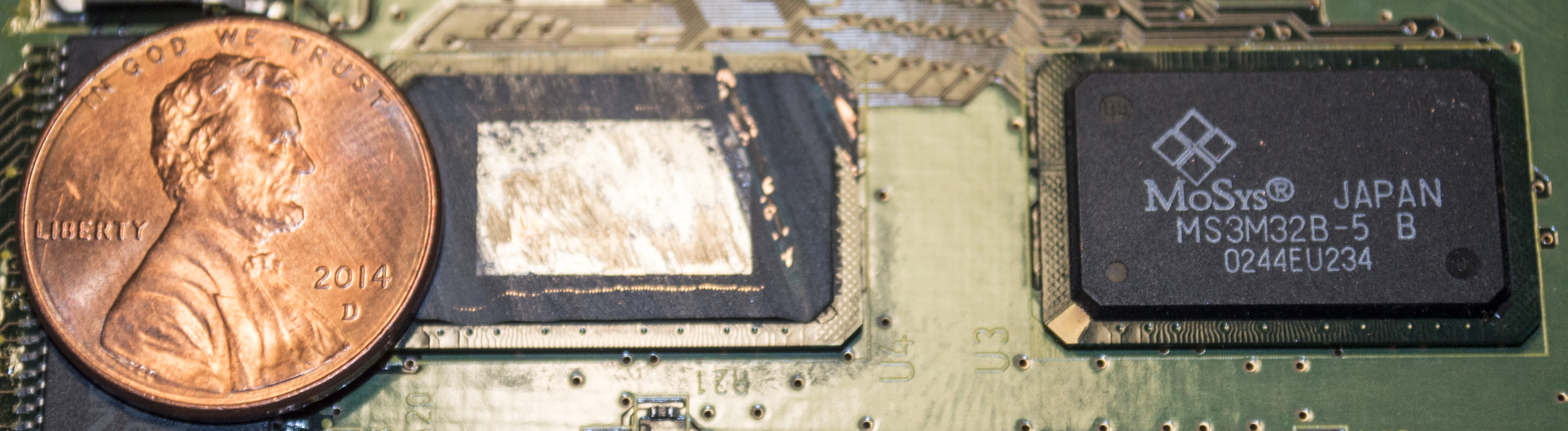
One of the two 1T-SRAM RAM modules shaved down to expose the die

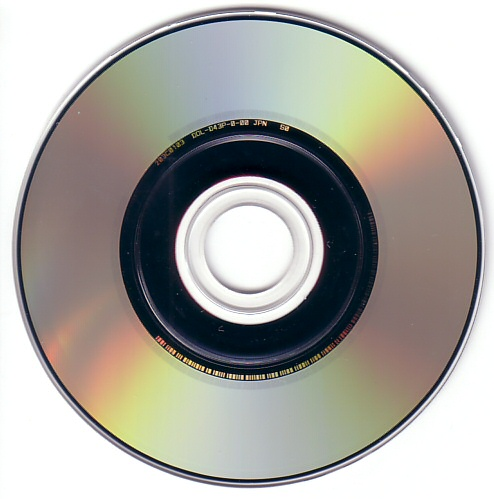
GameCube Game Disc

	Details	Ref.
CPU	32-bit 486 MHz IBM "Gekko" PowerPC CPU (based on the 750CXe and 750FX); 180 nm IBM six-layer, copper-wire process, 43 mm^{2} die with 4.9 watts dissipation; 1.8 V for logic and I/O; 27×27 mm PBGA package with 256 contacts; 18.6 million transistors; of which 6.35 million transistors are for logic; Superscalar 3 issue (2 plus branch folding); Out-of-order execution; Two 4-stage integer units: IU1 and IU2, 32-bit; Front-side bus: 162 MHz 64-bit enhanced 60x bus northbridge to Flipper; 1.3 GB/s peak bandwidth (32-bit address, 64-bit data bus); On-chip caches: 32 KB 8-way set-associative L1 instruction cache; 32 KB 8-way set-associative L1 data cache; Half of L1 data cache (16 KB) can be locked for fast DMA-from-cache in parallel with instruction execution; 256 KB 2-way set-associative L2 cache; 64-bit Floating Point Unit (FPU) coprocessor: PowerPC 750 + roughly 50 new SIMD instructions, geared toward 3D graphics; 7-stage pipeline; 32x 64-bit FPR registers; Usable as 1x 64-bit (double-precision) or 2× 32-bit (paired singles) SIMD per clock cycle.; 1.9 GFLOPS (single precision 32-bit floating point); IEEE compliant; Data Compression; 2:1 and 4:1 compression for graphics data yields 5.2 GB/s peak effective bus bandwidth; Load Q instruction: converts 8-bit or 16-bit, signed or unsigned integers to SP floating point; Store Q instruction: converts SP floating point to 8-bit or 16-bit, signed or unsigned integer; Branch Prediction Unit (BPU); Load-Store Unit (LSU); System Register Unit (SRU); Memory Management Unit (MMU); Branch Target Instruction Cache (BTIC); CPU performance: 1125 DMIPS (Dhrystone 2.1)	
GPU	162 MHz ArtX-designed ATI "Flipper" ASIC (9.4 GFLOPS); 180 nm NEC eDRAM manufacturing process, 51 million transistors (approximately half dedicated to 1T-SRAM), 106 mm^{2} die; Contains GPU, audio DSP, I/O controller and northbridge; 3 MB of on-chip 1T-SRAM (2 MB Z-buffer/framebuffer + 1 MB texture cache) with ~18 GB/s total bandwidth; Embedded 24-bit Z-buffer/framebuffer RAM: 2 MB (4× 512 KB); Bus width: 384-bit (4 buses, each 96-bit wide); Bandwidth: 7.8 GB/s; Sustainable latency: Under 5 ns; Embedded texture cache: 1 MB (32× 256 Kb); Bus width: 512-bit (32 buses, each 16-bit wide); Bandwidth: 10.4 GB/s; Sustainable latency: Under 5 ns; 24 MB (2× 12 MB) 1T-SRAM main memory @ 324 MHz, 64-bit bus, 2.6 GB/s bandwidth; 1 vertex pipeline, 4 pixel pipelines with 1 texture mapping unit (TMU) each and 4 render output units (ROPs); Simultaneous textures per pass: 4; Color depth: 16-bit RGB, 32-bit RGBA; System floating-point arithmetic capability: 11 GFLOPS (peak) (MPU, Geometry Engine, Hardware Lighting Total); Fillrate: 648 megapixels/sec, with Z-buffering, alpha blending, fogging, texture mapping, trilinear filtering, mipmapping and S3 Texture Compression; Raw polygon performance: 60 million polygons/sec; 40 million polygons/sec, with fogging, Z-buffering, alpha blending and Gouraud shading; 30 million polygons/sec, with fogging, Z-buffering, alpha blending and texture mapping; 25 million polygons/sec, with fogging, Z-buffering, alpha blending, texture mapping and lighting; 6-12 million polygons/sec, assuming actual game conditions, with complex models, fully textured, fully lit, etc.; 16-stage TEV fixed-function texture combiner unit (4 inputs, 1 output); Indirect texturing unit with 4 dedicated stages using a 2x3 transformation matrix to scale and rotate texture coordinate offsets, enabling per-pixel effects like bump mapping and refraction; Image processing functions: Volumetric fog, heat haze, motion blur, bloom, subpixel anti-aliasing, per-vertex lighting, 8 hardware lights, alpha blending, hardware transform and lighting (T&L), virtual texture design, multi-texturing, emboss bump mapping, Dot3 bump mapping (normal mapping), lightmapping, shadow mapping, shadow volumes, planar projection shadows, environment mapping, mipmapping, LOD, depth of field, perspective-correct texture mapping, bilinear filtering, trilinear filtering, anisotropic filtering, real-time hardware texture decompression (S3TC) (6:1 ratio), 8 simultaneous texture layers, 256 levels of transparency, clipping, hidden surface removal/culling, Zfreeze, Zcomploc/early-Z reject, bounding box, destination alpha test, alpha test, depth test, render to texture, TEV compare, color combiners, alpha combiners, texture combiners, transparency effects, framebuffer effects, post-processing effects, Gouraud shading, cel shading, dithering, can emulate 1-bit stencil buffer through a Zfreeze function; Other: Real-time decompression of display list, hardware motion compensation capability, HW 3-line deflickering filter	
System memory	43 MB total non-unified RAM; 24 MB (2× 12 MB) MoSys 1T-SRAM @ 324 MHz (codenamed "Splash") as main system RAM; 3 MB embedded 1T-SRAM cache within "Flipper" GPU (2 MB framebuffer/Z-buffer, 1 MB texture cache); 16 MB DRAM used as I/O buffer for audio and DVD drive; Memory bus width: 64-bit main system RAM, 896-bit internal GPU memory, 8-bit ARAM; Memory bandwidth: 1.3 GB/s Gekko to Northbridge, 2.6 GB/s Flipper to main system RAM, 10.4 GB/s texture cache, 7.8 GB/s framebuffer/Z-buffer, 81 MB/s auxiliary RAM; Latency: Under 10 ns main memory, 5 ns texture cache, 5 ns framebuffer memory	
Audio	Audio processor integrated into Flipper: custom 81 MHz Macronix 16-bit DSP; Sampling frequency: 48 kHz; 64 simultaneous channels, ADPCM encoding; Instruction memory: 8 KB RAM, 8 KB ROM; Data memory: 8 KB RAM, 4 KB ROM; External auxiliary RAM: 16 MB DRAM @ 81 MHz; Auxiliary RAM bus: 8-bit; Auxiliary RAM bus bandwidth: 81 MB/s; CPU can read/write blocks from RAM to ARAM through DMA; ARAM can be used for miscellaneous low-bandwidth purposes; Stereo output (may contain 5.1-channel surround via Dolby Pro Logic II)	
Video modes	640×480 interlaced (480i) @ 60 Hz; 640×480 progressive scan (480p) @ 60 Hz (mostly NTSC games only); 640×528 interlaced (576i) @ 50 Hz (PAL games only); Acceptable video modes: 15kHz, 24kHz, 31kHz	
Connectivity	4 controller ports, 2 memory card slots; 2 high-speed serial ports; Serial Port 1 is reserved for a broadband adapter or modem adapter; Serial Port 2 is unused (DOL-001 models only); 1 high-speed parallel port up to 81 MB/s (reserved for the Game Boy Player); Analog AV Out; NTSC models: S-Video, composite, RF; PAL models: RGBS (SCART), composite, RF; Stereophonic analog audio output; Digital AV Out (DOL-001 model only); Interlaced or progressive scan YC_{B}C_{R} synthesized to YP_{B}P_{R} using in-cable custom Macronix DAC; RCA (NTSC-U), D-Terminal (NTSC-J); Stereophonic I²S digital audio (not used by any cable)	
Storage	8 cm optical GameCube Game Disc; Approx. 1.5 GB capacity; 16 Mbit/s–25 Mbit/s transfer rate operating in CAV mode; 128 ms average access time; Memory card; Capacities: 512 KB (59 blocks), 2 MB (251 blocks), 8 MB (1,019 blocks, incompatible with some games); 8 KB sectors	
Other	Power supply; DC 12 volts; 3.25 A; Dimensions: 4.3 in (110 mm) (H) × 5.9 in (150 mm) (W) × 6.3 in (160 mm) (D)	

== Games ==
In its lifespan from 2001 to 2007, Nintendo licensed over 600 GameCube games. Nintendo bolstered the console's popularity by creating new franchises, such as Pikmin and Animal Crossing, which actually began as a Japanese exclusive on N64, and renewing some that had skipped the Nintendo 64, such as with Metroid Prime. Longer standing franchises include the critically acclaimed The Legend of Zelda: The Wind Waker and Super Mario Sunshine, as well as Mario Kart: Double Dash. Other Nintendo games are successors to Nintendo 64 games, such as the GameCube's best-selling game, Super Smash Bros. Melee, at more than 7 million copies worldwide, F-Zero GX; Mario Golf: Toadstool Tour; Mario Party 4, 5, 6, and 7; Mario Power Tennis; and Paper Mario: The Thousand-Year Door. Though committed to its software library, Nintendo was still criticized for not releasing enough launch window games and by the release of Luigi's Mansion instead of a 3D Mario game.

Nintendo had struggled with its family-friendly image during the late 1990s and most of the 2000s. However, during this period, it released more video games for a mature audience with mostly successful results. While the video game industry was focusing on more mature audiences and online connections, Nintendo regained older players who had gravitated to the PlayStation 2 and Xbox during the early 2000s. Some games aimed at older audiences were critically and financially successful—more than on Dreamcast, and less than on PlayStation 2 and Xbox. Such examples include The Legend of Zelda: Twilight Princess, Super Smash Bros. Melee, Resident Evil 4, Metal Gear Solid: The Twin Snakes, Killer7, Star Wars Rogue Squadron II: Rogue Leader, Final Fantasy Crystal Chronicles, Resident Evil (2002), Metroid Prime, Metroid Prime II: Echoes, Soul Calibur II, Resident Evil Zero, F-Zero GX, Star Fox Adventures, and Star Fox Assault. One of the most well-known GameCube games for mature audiences is Eternal Darkness: Sanity's Requiem, which underperformed financially, but garnered critical acclaim and is now regarded as a cult classic.

The GameCube is Nintendo's first home console with a system menu, activated by powering on without a valid game disc or by holding down the A button while one is loaded.

=== Third-party support ===
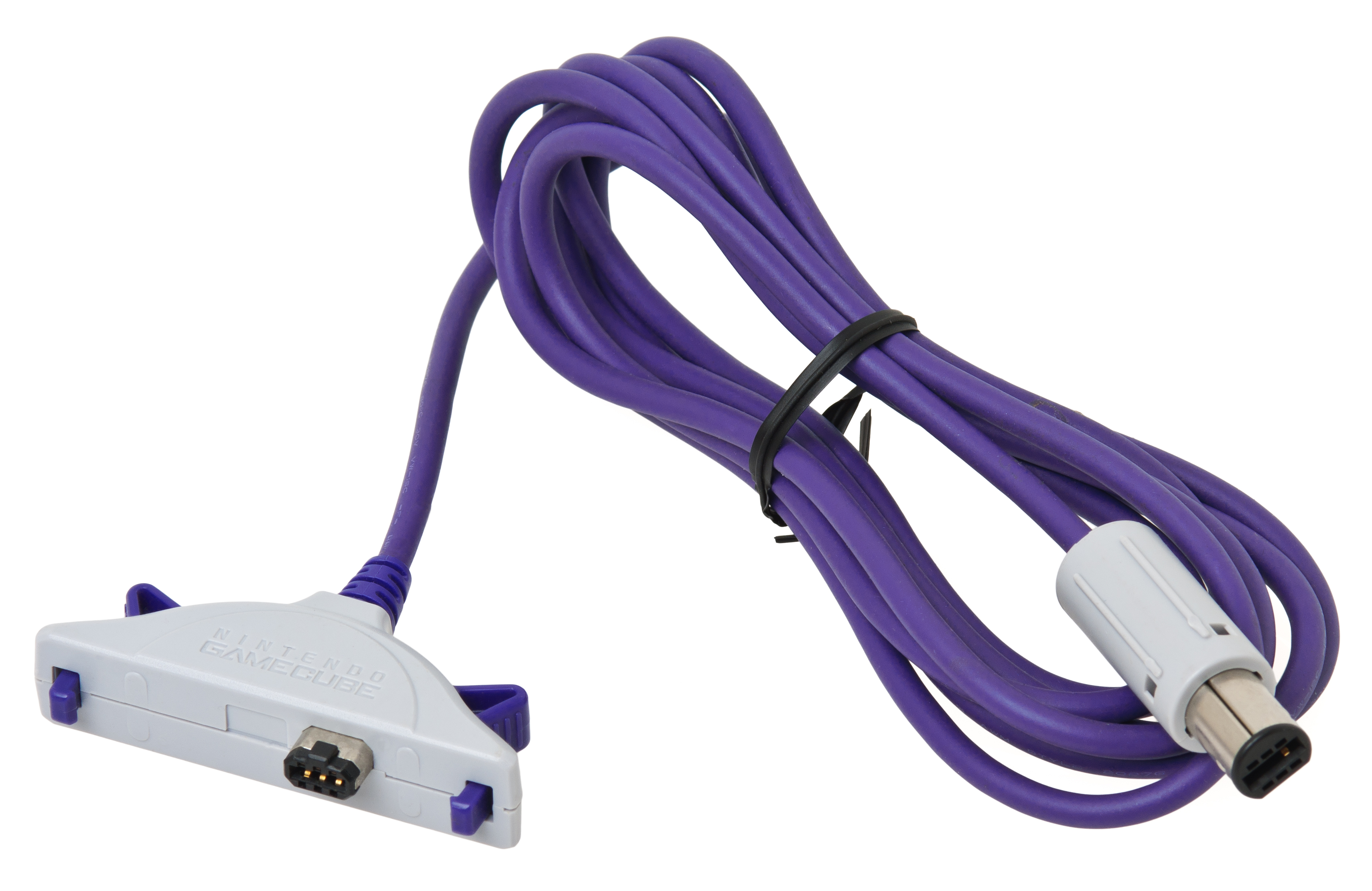
The link cable connects GBA to GameCube, with a few compatible games.

Early in Nintendo's history, the company had achieved considerable success with third-party developer support on the Nintendo Entertainment System and Super NES. Competition from the Sega Genesis and Sony PlayStation in the 1990s changed the market's landscape and reduced Nintendo's ability to obtain exclusive, third-party support on the Nintendo 64. The Nintendo 64 Game Pak cartridge format increased the cost to manufacture software, as opposed to the cheaper, higher-capacity optical discs on PlayStation.

With the GameCube, Nintendo intended to reverse the trend as evidenced by the number of third-party games available at launch. The new optical disc format increased game storage capacity significantly and reduced production costs. Successful exclusives include Star Wars Rogue Squadron II: Rogue Leader from Factor 5, Resident Evil 4 from Capcom, and Metal Gear Solid: The Twin Snakes from Konami. Sega discontinued its Dreamcast console to become a third-party developer, porting Dreamcast games such as Crazy Taxi and Sonic Adventure 2, and developing new franchises, such as Super Monkey Ball. Longtime Nintendo partner Rare, which had developed GoldenEye 007, Perfect Dark, Banjo-Kazooie, Conker's Bad Fur Day, and the Donkey Kong Country series, released Star Fox Adventures for GameCube, its final Nintendo game before acquisition by Microsoft in 2002. Several third-party developers were contracted to work on new games for Nintendo franchises, including Star Fox: Assault (which became a Player's Choice re-release), Donkey Konga by Namco, and Wario World from Treasure. Capcom had announced 5 games for the system dubbed the Capcom Five in November 2002, Viewtiful Joe and Resident Evil 4 were later ported to other systems.

Third-party GameCube support was some of the most extensive of any Nintendo console predating the Wii. Some third-party developers, such as Midway, Namco, Activision, Konami, Ubisoft, THQ, Disney Interactive Studios, Humongous Entertainment, Electronic Arts, and EA Sports, continued to release GameCube games into 2007. One of the biggest third-party GameCube developers was Sega, which had quit the console hardware market to become a third-party game developer after the failure of the Dreamcast. It partnered with long-time rival Nintendo, and with Microsoft and Sony, to recuperate profits lost from the Dreamcast. Sega was a successful third-party developer since the early 2000s, mostly those for the family market, such as Super Monkey Ball, Phantasy Star Online, Sonic Adventure, Sonic Adventure 2: Battle, and Sonic Heroes.

=== Online gaming ===
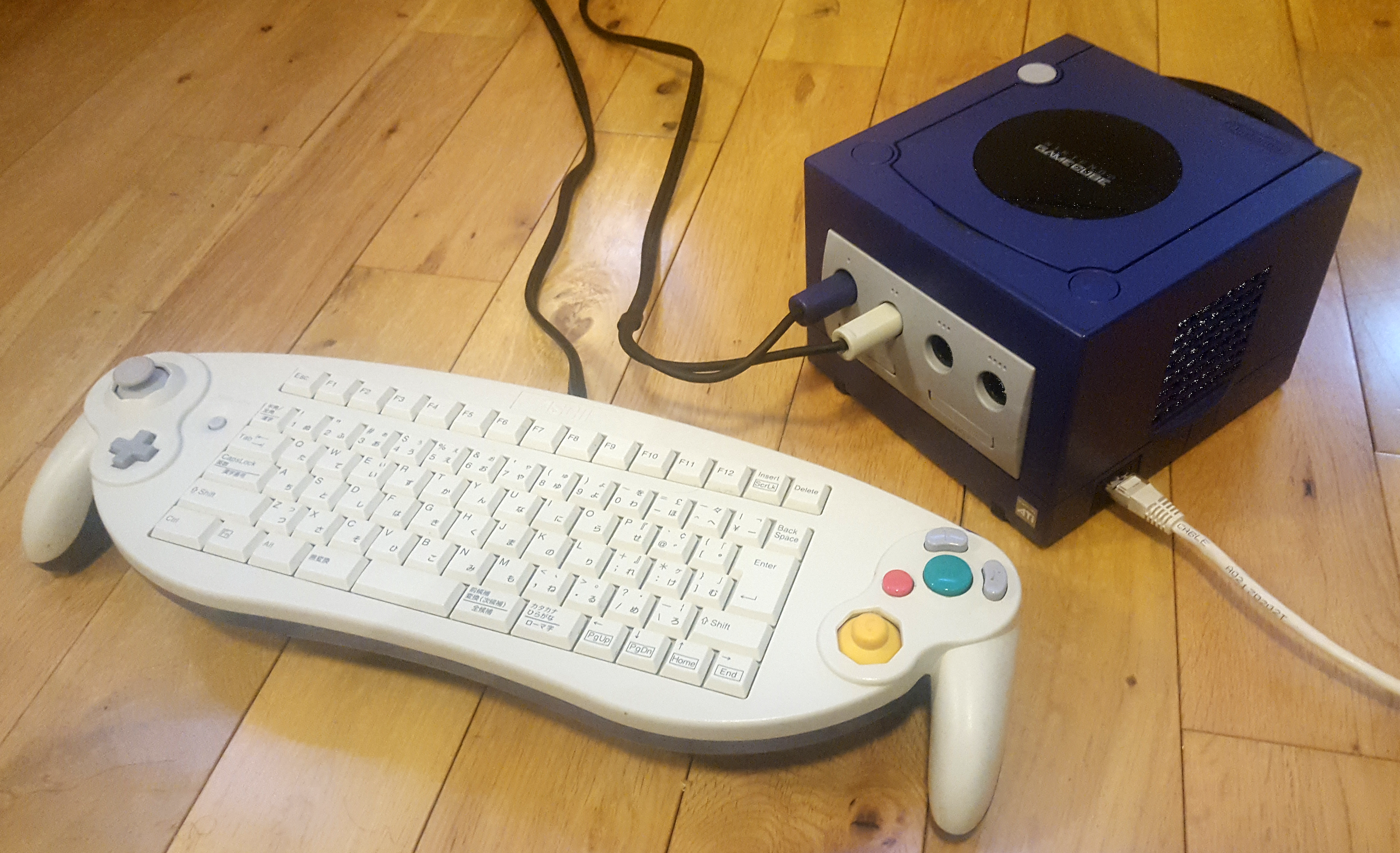
The GameCube has a broadband adapter and ethernet cable. ASCII Corporation produced a keyboard for Phantasy Star Online.

Nintendo's GameCube did not put heavy focus on online games earlier in the console's life. Only eight GameCube games support network connectivity, five with Internet support and three with local area network (LAN) support. The only Internet capable games released in western territories are three role-playing games (RPGs) in Sega's Phantasy Star series: Phantasy Star Online Episode I & II, Phantasy Star Online Episode I & II Plus, and Phantasy Star Online Episode III: C.A.R.D. Revolution. The official servers were decommissioned in 2007, but players can still connect to fan maintained private servers. Japan received two additional games with Internet capabilities, a cooperative RPG, Homeland and a baseball game with downloadable content, Jikkyō Powerful Pro Yakyū 10. Lastly, three racing games have LAN multiplayer modes: 1080° Avalanche, Kirby Air Ride, and Mario Kart: Double Dash. Those can be forced over the Internet with third-party PC software capable of tunneling the GameCube's network traffic.

Online play requires an official broadband or modem adapter because the GameCube lacks out of the box network capabilities. Nintendo never commissioned any Internet services for GameCube but allowed other publishers to manage custom online experiences.

=== Emulation ===
On June 5, 2025, several GameCube games were re-released on the Nintendo Classics Service as part of the "Expansion Pack" tier of Nintendo Switch Online exclusively for the Nintendo Switch 2.

== Reception ==
The GameCube received generally positive reviews following its launch. PC Magazine praised the overall hardware design and quality of games available at launch. CNET gave an average review rating, noting that though the console lacks a few features offered by its competition, it is relatively inexpensive, has a great controller design, and launched a decent lineup of games. In later reviews, criticism mounted against the console often centering on its overall look and feel, describing it as "toy-ish". With poor sales figures and the associated financial harm to Nintendo, a Time International article called the GameCube an "unmitigated disaster".

Retrospectively, Joystiq compared the GameCube's launch window to its successor, the Wii, noting that the GameCube's "lack of games" resulted in a subpar launch, and the console's limited selection of online games damaged its market share in the long run. Time International concluded that the system had low sales figures, because it lacked "technical innovations".

=== Sales ===
In Japan, between 280,000 and 300,000 GameCube consoles were sold during the first three days of its sale, out of an initial shipment of 450,000 units. During its launch weekend, $100 million worth of GameCube products were sold in North America. The console was sold out in several stores, faster than initial sales of both of its competitors, the Xbox and the PlayStation 2. Nintendo reported that the most popular launch game is Luigi's Mansion, with more sales at its launch than Super Mario 64 had. Other popular games include Star Wars Rogue Squadron II: Rogue Leader and Wave Race: Blue Storm. By early December 2001, 600,000 units had been sold in the US.

Nintendo predicted 50 million GameCube units by 2005, but only sold 22 million GameCube units worldwide during its lifespan, placing it slightly behind the Xbox's 24 million (though it did manage to outsell the Xbox in Japan), and well behind the PlayStation 2's 155 million. Ars Technica articles from 2006 showed and a 2020 book state that Nintendo officially sold 24 million GameCube consoles worldwide, and one article from Seeking Alpha states that the GameCube sold 26 million consoles worldwide. Its sales exceeded that of the Xbox 360 in Japan. The GameCube's predecessor, the Nintendo 64, also outperformed it at nearly 33 million units. It also exceeded the Dreamcast, which yielded 9.13 million units. In September 2009, IGN ranked the GameCube 16th in its list of best gaming consoles of all time, placing it behind all three of its sixth-generation competitors: the PlayStation 2 (3rd), the Dreamcast (8th), and the Xbox (11th). As of March 31, 2003, 9.55 million GameCube units had been sold worldwide, behind Nintendo's initial goal of 10 million consoles. Many of Nintendo's own first-party games, such as Super Smash Bros. Melee, Pokémon Colosseum, and Mario Kart: Double Dash, had strong sales, though this did not typically benefit third-party developers or directly drive sales of their games. However, at the same time, these first-party games, and second-party and third-party games, elevated the GameCube. (Note: Attributed to multiple references:)

Sales of many cross-platform games—such as sports franchises released by Electronic Arts—were far below their PlayStation 2 and Xbox counterparts, eventually prompting some developers to scale back or completely cease support for the GameCube. Exceptions include Sega's family friendly Sonic Adventure 2 and Super Monkey Ball, which reportedly yielded more sales on GameCube than most of the company's games on the PlayStation 2 and Xbox. In June 2003, Acclaim Entertainment CEO Rod Cousens said that the company would no longer support the GameCube, and criticized it as a system "that don't deliver profits". Acclaim would later rescind his claims, by saying the company would elevate support for the system. This decision was made unclear after the company filed for bankruptcy in August 2004. In September 2003, Eidos Interactive announced to end support for the GameCube, as the publisher was losing money from developing for Nintendo's console. This led to several games in development being canceled for the system. Eidos's CEO Mike McGravey would say that the GameCube was a "declining business". However, after the company's purchase by the SCi Entertainment Group in 2005, Eidos resumed development for the system and released Lego Star Wars: The Video Game and Tomb Raider: Legend.

In March 2003, British retailer Dixons removed all GameCube consoles, accessories and games from its stores. That same month, another British retailer Argos, cut the price of the GameCube in their stores to £78.99, which was more than £50 cheaper than Nintendo's SRP for the console at the time. However, in October of that year, they did eventually restock their supply of consoles after a price drop was ordered which caused the console sales to outpace the PlayStation 2 for a week.

With sales sagging and millions of unsold consoles in stock, Nintendo halted GameCube production for the first nine months of 2003 to reduce surplus units. Sales rebounded slightly after a price drop to US$99.99 on September 24, 2003 and the release of The Legend of Zelda: Collector's Edition bundle. A demo disc, the GameCube Preview Disc, was also released in a bundle in 2003. Beginning with this period, GameCube sales continued to be steady, particularly in Japan, but the GameCube remained in third place in worldwide sales during the sixth-generation era because of weaker sales performance elsewhere, though its fortunes would change for the better in America and Europe.

Iwata forecasted to investors that the company would sell 50 million GameCube units worldwide by March 2005, but by the end of 2006, it had only sold 21.74 million—fewer than half. However, it had the highest attach rate of any Nintendo console at 9.59 and was profitable, even more than Xbox with higher sales rates.

=== Legacy ===
Many games that debuted on the GameCube, including the Pikmin series, Chibi-Robo!, Metroid Prime, and Luigi's Mansion became popular and profitable Nintendo franchises or subseries. (Note: Attributed to multiple references:)

GameCube controllers have limited support on Wii U and Switch, to play Super Smash Bros. for Wii U, and Super Smash Bros. Ultimate respectively, via a USB adapter. While on the Wii U the controller was only allowed to be used in Super Smash Bros., the Nintendo Switch recognizes it as a Pro Controller. Thus, the GameCube Controller can be used in any game where the Pro Controller is recognized. However, due to the GameCube controller lacking motion controls and some buttons, it may not be fully playable in some Switch games.

Regarding concerns about the correlation between violence and video games, a 2009 study by Iowa State University found that certain games like Super Mario Sunshine and Chibi-Robo!, which were GameCube exclusives, would help players learn positive skills about helping others, empathy, and cooperation. The game Super Monkey Ball, which was a GameCube exclusive, could help surgeons perform laparoscopic surgery better than surgeons who do not play video games.

GamesRadar+ ranked it 11th on their list of The 20 best video game consoles and hardware of all time in 2021. Den of Geek placed it at number 12 on their list of The 25 Best Video Game Consoles Ever, Ranked, in 2023.

== See also ==
- Dolphin (emulator)
- GameCube accessories
