= Phantasy Star Online Episode III: C.A.R.D. Revolution =

2003 video game

- North American box art
- Developer: Sonic Team
- Publisher: Sega
- Director: Yojiro Ogawa
- Producer: Yuji Naka
- Designer: Kenichi Fujiwara
- Programmer: Koichi Toya
- Artist: Ayumu Nishino
- Composers: Hideaki Kobayashi; Kenichi Tokoi; Fumie Kumatani
- Series: Phantasy Star
- Platform: GameCube
- Release: JP: November 27, 2003; NA: March 2, 2004; PAL: June 11, 2004
- Genre: Role-playing
- Modes: Single-player, multiplayer

Phantasy Star Online Episode III: C.A.R.D. Revolution (ファンタシースターオンライン エピソードIII カードレボリューション, Fantashī Sutā Onrain Episōdo III Kādo Reboryūshon) is a turn-based role-playing video game released for the GameCube in 2003. It has a card-based play style, making it unique among games in the Phantasy Star Online series. The story of the game takes place twenty-one years after the fourth episode, itself set after the first two episodes.

== Gameplay ==
A screenshot of the gameplay for Episode III, showing both Hunters (near) and Arkz (far)

Games are played either against computer players or against real-world players, using a customizable deck of exactly thirty cards. In the offline story mode, players fight against computer controlled opponents to unlock new missions and advance the story. In the online mode, players battle each other under customizable settings. There is also an offline free battle mode, which allows multiplayer battles for up to four players offline. Battles are turn-based and take place on a grid of varying size. During their turn, players can activate cards from their deck to equip weapons, summon monsters and attack the enemy. Cards can also be used during the opponent's turn to defend against their attacks. A dice roll at the beginning of each turn determines how many actions can be taken in a single turn. The battle ends when one player has lost all their hit points. After each battle, the player receives new cards to use in their deck. More cards are received if the battle was won.

Players can choose to play as either the Hunters (Heroside) or Arkz (Darkside) in battle. They must also choose one of twelve characters from each side, each with varying special abilities and hit points. The two sides fight in different ways. Hunters fight by equipping weapons, Mags (small flying robots which augment the character's abilities) and shields, whilst Arkz players have only one set weapon, and use their decks to summon creatures to attack for them. For both sides there is a limit to how many cards can be in play. More powerful cards use up more of this limit than weaker ones. A battle ends when one side depletes the hit points of the other side. Many of the weapons, Mags, techniques and creatures available are the same as those found in Episodes I and II.

When not in battle, the player controls a customizable commander character on board Pioneer 2. During offline play, the player can customize decks, interact with computer characters to discover information about the plot, and choose which battle to fight next. Online, the character is used to interact with other online players to arrange battles and tournaments.

To play the game online, a GameCube modem or broadband adapter was needed. To play using the official server required the purchase of a 30-day "Hunter's License". The same license could be used to play Episodes I and II. On April 1, 2007, the official Sega server for online play was shut down.

== Plot ==
In Phantasy Star Online Episodes I and II, the spaceship Pioneer 2 arrived at the uninhabited planet Ragol in hopes of colonization in response to the failing ecosystem of the home planet Coral. In Episode III, Pioneer 2 has since gained independence from Coral, but inner strife still prevents an organized colonization, and it remains in orbit above Ragol.

The government of Pioneer 2 also hopes to exploit "the germ", a mysterious substance discovered on the planet, which they use to power the newly developed "C.A.R.D. technology", which is used to store items such as weapons as cards and allow them to be used much more efficiently. C.A.R.D. is an acronym for "compressed alternate reality data". The game can be played as either the "Heroside" or the "Darkside". The "Heroside" are military commanders, who take orders from the government to explore, research, and ultimately, capture the Arkz, an anti-government faction. The "Darkside" are the Arkz, founded by a man known only as Red. The Arkz try to intercept and destroy the government's plans for the exploitation of the planet. They oppose the use of C.A.R.D. technology due to its unpredictability and the lack of complete understanding of the germ. They still, however, use a stolen version of the technology in order to be able to compete with Heroside. Both sides also search for the location of the "Great Shadow", the source of the germ.

Within the two factions, each character has their own goals and aspirations, and playing as certain characters in battle will reveal different aspects of the story. When both sides of the story are completed, one after another, it is discovered that the government, while experimenting with the germ for clone technology, is attempting to create bio-soldiers with the genetic material of Red's deceased twin daughters. The final boss for Heroside is a rejected mutated clone of Pollux, and the final boss for Darkside is a rejected mutated clone of the other twin, Castor. After completing the storylines and their boss battles, there is a final battle with the source of the germ, Amplum Umbra. Once the source is destroyed, Pioneer 2 finally lands on Ragol, and the colonization of the planet begins.

== Reception ==
Reception

Aggregate score
Aggregator	Score
Metacritic	71/100

Review scores
Publication	Score
Edge	6/10
Electronic Gaming Monthly	8.67/10 (Note: Two critics of Electronic Gaming Monthly gave the game each a score of 9/10, and the other gave it 8/10.)
Famitsu	32/40
Game Informer	8/10
GameSpot	7.2/10
GameSpy	3/5
IGN	8.5/10
Nintendo Power	3.9/5
Nintendo World Report	6.5/10
X-Play	3/5

The game received "mixed or average reviews" according to the review aggregation website Metacritic. GameSpot said, "It's probably not what fans were expecting, but on its own terms, PSO III is a good game." IGN wrote that the game was a "real testament of game design" that minded the requests of series fans. GameSpy found the game "unexceptional". In Japan, Famitsu gave it a score of all four eights for a total of 32 out of 40. Strafe Maru of GamePro called it "an incredibly addictive card-battling game with mighty fine graphics and excellent sound and music – just don't expect it to be about role-playing." (Note: GamePro gave the game 4/5 for graphics, 4.5/5 for sound, 3/5 for control, and 3.5/5 for fun factor.)
